= Timeline of the 2007–08 South-West Indian Ocean cyclone season =

Timeline of the 2007-08 South-West Indian Ocean cyclone season
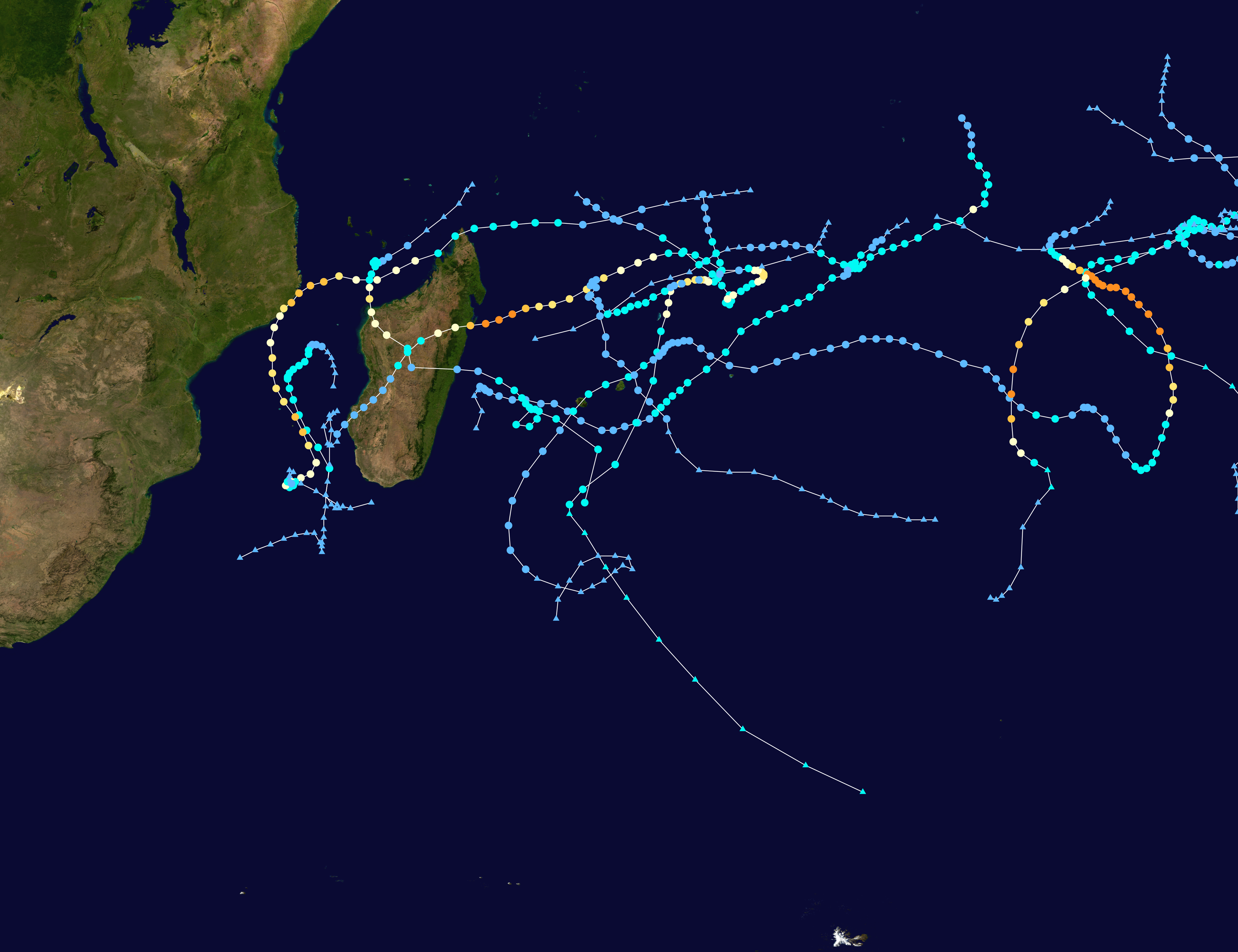
- Season summary map

Season boundaries
- First system formed: October 12, 2007
- Last system dissipated: March 27, 2008

Strongest system
- Name: Hondo
- Maximum winds: 215 km/h (130 mph) (10-minute sustained)
- Lowest pressure: 915 hPa (mbar)

Longest lasting system
- Name: Hondo
- Duration: 27 days
Storm articles
- Cyclone Hondo
- Cyclone Ivan
- Cyclone Jokwe

The 2007–08 South-West Indian Ocean cyclone season was a cycle of the annual tropical cyclone season in the South-West Indian Ocean in the Southern Hemisphere. It began on November 15, 2007, and ended on April 30, 2008, with the exception for Mauritius and the Seychelles, which ended May 15. These dates conventionally delimit the period of each year when most tropical cyclones form in the basin, which is west of 90°E and south of the Equator. Tropical cyclones in this basin are monitored by the Regional Specialised Meteorological Centre in Réunion.

This timeline documents all the storm formations, strengthening, weakening, landfalls, extratropical transitions, as well as dissipations in the basin.

== Timeline ==
=== October ===
October 11
1200 UTC - The Sub-Regional Tropical Cyclone Advisory Center in Mauritius begins issuing advisories on a tropical disturbance while located 785 km (490 mi) southeast of the Seychelles.
October 12
0600 UTC - Météo-France designates the disturbance as Tropical Disturbance 01-20072008.
October 13
1200 UTC - Tropical Disturbance 01-20072008 dissipates over open waters.

=== November ===
November 15
1200 UTC - Météo-France begins advisories on Tropical Cyclone Lee, which is redesignated Severe Tropical Storm Ariel by Mauritius as it crosses 90°E and out of TCWC Perth's area of responsibility.

November 17
0000 UTC - Météo-France downgrades Severe Tropical Storm Ariel to a moderate tropical storm.
0600 UTC - Météo-France downgrades Moderate Tropical Storm Ariel to a tropical depression.

November 18
0900 UTC - The JTWC designates 98S.INVEST as Tropical Cyclone 04S.
1200 UTC - Météo-France designates Tropical Cyclone 04S as Tropical Disturbance 03R.
1800 UTC - Météo-France upgrades Tropical Disturbance 03R to a Tropical Depression

November 19
0600 UTC - Mauritius Meteorological Services names Tropical Depression 03R as Moderate Tropical Storm Bongwe.
0900 UTC - Météo-France upgrades Moderate Tropical Storm Bongwe to Severe Tropical Storm Bongwe.

November 20
1800 UTC - Météo-France downgrades Severe Tropical Storm Bongwe to a moderate tropical storm.

November 22
0000 UTC - Météo-France reupgrades Moderate Tropical Storm Bongwe to a severe tropical storm.

November 23
0000 UTC - Météo-France redowngrades Severe Tropical Storm Bongwe to a moderate tropical storm.
1800 UTC - Météo-France downgrades Moderate Tropical Storm Bongwe to a depression.
2100 UTC - The JTWC issues its last advisory on Tropical Cyclone 04S.

November 24
0000 UTC - Météo-France downgrades Tropical Depression 3 (ex-Bongwe) to a tropical disturbance.
1200 UTC - Météo-France issues its last advisory on Tropical Disturbance 3 (ex-Bongwe).

=== December ===
December 12
1800 UTC - Météo-France declares 96S.INVEST as Tropical Disturbance 04R.

December 13
0900 UTC - The JTWC designates Tropical Disturbance 04R, south-southwest of Diego Garcia as Tropical Cyclone 06S.

December 14
0600 UTC - Météo-France upgrades Tropical Disturbance 04R to Tropical Depression 04R.

December 17
0600 UTC - Mauritius Meteorological Service upgrades Tropical Depression 04R and designates it as Moderate Tropical Storm Celina.

December 18
0300 UTC - The JTWC issues its final tropical cyclone advisory on a weakening Tropical Cyclone 06S (Celina).
1200 UTC - Météo-France downgrades Moderate Tropical Storm Celina to a tropical depression.
1200 UTC - Météo-France designates 97S.INVEST as Tropical Disturbance 05R.
1500 UTC - The JTWC designates Tropical Disturbance 05R, east-southeast of Diego Garcia as Tropical Cyclone 07S.
1800 UTC - Météo-France upgraded Tropical Disturbance 05R to Tropical Depression 05R.

December 19
1200 UTC - Météo-France downgrades Tropical Depression Celina to a tropical disturbance.

December 20
1200 UTC - Mauritius Meteorological Services upgrades Tropical Depression 05 and designates it as Moderate Tropical Storm Dama.

December 21
0600 UTC - Météo-France downgrades Moderate Tropical Storm Dama to a tropical depression.
1200 UTC - Météo-France issues its final advisory on Tropical Disturbance 04R (Celina) as it begins to dissipate.
1200 UTC - Météo-France issues its final advisory on Tropical Depression 05R (Dama).
1500 UTC - JTWC issues its final advisory on Tropical Cyclone 07S (Dama) as its transists into an extropical system.

December 31
0000 UTC - Météo-France designates 91S.INVEST as Tropical Disturbance 06R.
0600 UTC - Météo-France upgrades Tropical Disturbance 06R to Tropical Depression 06R.
1500 UTC - The JTWC designates Tropical Depression 06R west of Antananarivo, Madagascar as Tropical Cyclone 09S.

=== January ===
January 1
0000 UTC - Seychelles Meteorological Services upgrades Tropical Depression 06R and designates it as Moderate Tropical Storm Elnus.

January 2
0600 UTC - Météo-France downgrades Moderate Tropical Storm Elnus to a tropical depression.

January 3
1200 UTC - Météo-France downgrades Tropical Depression Elnus to a tropical disturbance.

January 4
0300 UTC - The JTWC issues its final advisory on Tropical Cyclone 09S (Elnus) as it weakens and begins its extratropical transition.
0600 UTC - Météo-France re-classifies Tropical Disturbance Elnus as Extratropical Depression Elnus.

January 5
1200 UTC - Météo-France issues its final advisory on Extratropical Depression Elnus.

January 7
0000 UTC - Météo-France designates 95S.INVEST as Tropical Disturbance 07R.

January 8
1200 UTC - Météo-France issues its final advisory on Tropical Disturbance 07R noting that it had dissipated.

January 24
1200 UTC - Météo-France designates 97S.INVEST, north-northwest of Antananarivo, Madagascar as Tropical Disturbance 08R.

January 25
1200 UTC - Météo-France upgrades Tropical Disturbance 08R to Tropical Depression 08R.
1800 UTC - Seychelles Meteorological Services upgrades Tropical Depression 08R to Moderate Tropical Storm Fame.

January 26
1200 UTC - Météo-France upgrades Moderate Tropical Storm Fame to Severe Tropical Storm Fame.
1200 UTC - Météo-France designates 98S.INVEST, northeast of Réunion as Tropical Disturbance 09R.

January 27
0300 UTC - The JTWC designates Tropical Disturbance 09R as Tropical Cyclone 14S.
0600 UTC - Météo-France upgrades Tropical Disturbance 09R to Tropical Depression 09R.
1200 UTC - Mauritius Meteorological Services designates Tropical Depression 09R as Moderate Tropical Storm Gula.
1300 UTC - Severe Tropical Storm Fame becomes Tropical Cyclone Fame just as it makes landfall near Besalampy, Madagascar.
1800 UTC - Tropical Cyclone Fame is downgraded to Overland Depression Ex-Fame.

January 28
1200 UTC - Météo-France issues its last advisory on Overland Depression Ex-Fame.
1200 UTC - Météo-France upgrades Moderate Tropical Storm Gula to Severe Tropical Storm Gula.

January 29
0600 UTC - Météo-France upgrades Severe Tropical Storm Gula to Tropical Cyclone Gula.
1800 UTC - The remnants of Fame emerge over water after traversing Madagascar, and Météo-France reissues advisories on Tropical Depression Ex-Fame.

January 30
0600 UTC - Météo-France downgrades Tropical Cyclone Gula to Severe Tropical Storm Gula.
1200 UTC - Météo-France downgrades Severe Tropical Storm Gula to Moderate Tropical Storm Gula.

=== February ===
February 1
0000 UTC - Météo-France reupgrades Moderate Tropical Storm Gula to Severe Tropical Storm Gula.
0600 UTC - Météo-France declares Fame extratropical.
1200 UTC - Météo-France redeclares Fame as tropical and issues its last advisory.
1200 UTC - Météo-France redowngrades Severe Tropical Storm Gula to Moderate Tropical Storm Gula.
1800 UTC - Météo-France declares Gula extratropical.

February 2
0000 UTC - Météo-France issues its last advisory on Extratropical Depression Ex-Gula.

February 4
0600 UTC - Météo-France designates 93S.INVEST as Tropical Disturbance 10R.

February 5
0000 UTC - Météo-France upgrades Tropical Disturbance 10R to Tropical Depression 10R.
0600 UTC - Mauritius Meteorological Service upgrades Tropical Depression 10R to Moderate Tropical Storm Hondo.
1200 UTC - Météo-France upgrades Moderate Tropical Storm Hondo to Tropical Cyclone Hondo.

February 6
1800 UTC - Météo-France upgrades Tropical Cyclone Hondo to Intense Tropical Cyclone Hondo.

February 7
0600 UTC - Météo-France designates 94S.INVEST as Tropical Depression 11R.
1200 UTC - Mauritius Meteorological Services upgrades Tropical Depression 11R to Moderate Tropical Storm Ivan.
1800 UTC - Météo-France upgrades Intense Tropical Cyclone Hondo to Very Intense Tropical Cyclone Hondo.
1800 UTC - Météo-France upgrades Moderate Tropical Storm Ivan to Severe Tropical Storm Ivan.

February 8
0000 UTC - Météo-France downgrades Very Intense Tropical Cyclone Hondo to an intense tropical cyclone.

February 10
0600 UTC - Météo-France downgrades Intense Tropical Cyclone Hondo to a tropical cyclone.

February 11
0000 UTC - Météo-France downgrades Tropical Cyclone Hondo to a severe tropical storm.
1200 UTC - Météo-France downgrades Severe Tropical Storm Hondo to a moderate tropical storm.
1200 UTC - Météo-France upgrades Severe Tropical Storm Ivan to Tropical Cyclone Ivan.

February 12
0600 UTC - Météo-France downgrades Tropical Cyclone Ivan to a severe tropical storm.
1200 UTC - Météo-France downgrades Moderate Tropical Storm Hondo to a "filling depression" and issues its final advisory.
1800 UTC - Météo-France downgrades Severe Tropical Storm Ivan to a moderate tropical storm.

February 14
0600 UTC - Météo-France reupgrades Moderate Tropical Storm Ivan to Severe Tropical Storm Ivan.

February 15
1200 UTC - Meteo-France reupgrades Severe Tropical Storm Ivan to Tropical Cyclone Ivan .

February 16
1200 UTC - Meteo-France upgrades Tropical Cyclone Ivan to Intense Tropical Cyclone Ivan.

February 17
0615 UTC - Intense Tropical Cyclone Ivan makes landfall near Fanoarivo, Madagascar.
1200 UTC - Meteo-France downgrades Intense Tropical Cyclone Ivan to Overland Depression Ex-Ivan

February 18
1200 UTC - Météo-France issues its final advisory on Overland Depression Ex-Ivan.

February 21
0000 UTC - Hondo regenerates, and Météo-France re-issues advisories on Tropical Disturbance Ex-Hondo.
0000 UTC - Ivan regenerates, and Météo-France re-issues advisories on Filling Depression Ex-Ivan.
1500 UTC - Météo-France upgrades Tropical Disturbance Ex-Hondo to Tropical Depression Ex-Hondo.

February 22
1200 UTC - Météo-France downgrades Filling Depression Ex-Ivan to a zone of disturbed weather and issues its last advisory.
1500 UTC - Météo-France downgrades Tropical Depression Ex-Hondo to a tropical disturbance.

February 24
1500 UTC - Météo-France issues its last advisory on Tropical Disturbance Ex-Hondo.

=== March ===
March 4
1800 UTC - Météo-France designates 97S.INVEST as Tropical Disturbance 12R.

March 5
0300 UTC - The JTWC designates Tropical Disturbance 12R as Tropical Cyclone 22S.
0600 UTC - Météo-France upgrades Tropical Disturbance 12R as Tropical Depression 12R.
1200 UTC - Seychelles Meteorological Services upgrades Tropical Depression 12R to a tropical storm and designates it as Moderate Tropical Storm Jokwe.

March 6
1200 UTC - Meteo-France upgrades Moderate Tropical Storm Jokwe to Tropical Cyclone Jokwe.

March 7
0000 UTC - Météo-France designates 99S.INVEST as Tropical Disturbance 13R.
0000 UTC - Météo-France downgrades Tropical Cyclone Jokwe to a severe tropical storm.
1200 UTC - Météo-France upgrades Severe Tropical Storm Jokwe to Tropical Cyclone Jokwe.
1200 UTC - Météo-France upgrades Tropical Disturbance 13R to Tropical Depression 13R.
1500 UTC - The JTWC designates Tropical Depression 13R as Tropical Cyclone 23S.
1800 UTC - Météo-France upgrades Tropical Cyclone Jokwe to Intense Tropical Cyclone Jokwe.

March 8
1015 UTC - Intense Tropical Cyclone Jokwe makes landfall between Mozambique Island and Angoche City.
1200 UTC - Météo-France downgrades Intense Tropical Cyclone Jokwe to a tropical cyclone.

March 9
0000 UTC - Météo-France upgrades Tropical Depression 13R to Moderate Tropical Storm 13R.
0300 UTC - Mauritius Meteorological Services names Moderate Tropical Storm 13R Moderate Tropical Storm Kamba.
0600 UTC - Météo-France downgrades Tropical Cyclone Jokwe to a severe tropical storm.
1200 UTC - Météo-France upgrades Moderate Tropical Storm Kamba to Severe Tropical Storm Kamba.
1800 UTC - Météo-France re-upgrades Severe Tropical Storm Jokwe to Tropical Cyclone Jokwe.

March 10
0000 UTC - Meteo-France upgrades Severe Tropical Storm Kamba to Tropical Cyclone Kamba.
1200 UTC - Meteo-France upgrades Tropical Cyclone Kamba to Intense Tropical Cyclone Kamba.

March 11
0000 UTC - Météo-France re-upgrades Tropical Cyclone Jokwe to Intense Tropical Cyclone Jokwe.
0600 UTC - Météo-France downgrades Intense Tropical Cyclone Jokwe to a tropical cyclone.
1200 UTC - Météo-France downgrades Intense Tropical Cyclone Kamba to a tropical cyclone.

March 12
0000 UTC - Météo-France downgrades Tropical Cyclone Kamba to a severe tropical storm.
0000 UTC - Météo-France downgrades Tropical Cyclone Jokwe to a severe tropical storm.
0300 UTC - The JTWC issues its final warning on Tropical Cyclone 23S (Kamba).
0600 UTC - Météo-France downgrades Severe Tropical Storm Kamba to a moderate tropical storm.
1200 UTC - Météo-France downgrades Moderate Tropical Storm Kamba to a filling depression and issues its final advisory.

March 13
0600 UTC - Météo-France re-upgrades Severe Tropical Storm Jokwe to Tropical Cyclone Jokwe.
1200 UTC - Météo-France downgrades Tropical Cyclone Jokwe to a severe tropical storm.

March 14
0600 UTC - Météo-France downgrades Severe Tropical Storm Jokwe to a moderate tropical storm.
1800 UTC - Météo-France downgrades Moderate Tropical Storm Jokwe to a tropical depression.
1800 UTC - The JTWC issues its final warning on Tropical Cyclone 22S (Jokwe).

March 15
0000 UTC - Météo-France downgrades Tropical Depression Jokwe to a tropical disturbance and issues its final advisory.

March 20
1200 UTC - Météo-France designates 94S.INVEST as Zone of Disturbed Weather 14R.

March 21
1200 UTC - Météo-France upgrades Zone of Disturbed Weather 14R to Tropical Disturbance 14R.
1800 UTC - Météo-France upgrades Tropical Disturbance 14R to Tropical Depression 14R.
2100 UTC - The JTWC designates Tropical Depression 14R as Tropical Cyclone 25S.

March 22
0000 UTC - Mauritius Meteorological Services upgrades Tropical Depression 14R and designates it as Moderate Tropical Storm Lola.
1800 UTC - Météo-France downgrades Moderate Tropical Storm Lola to a tropical depression.

March 24
0600 UTC - Météo-France downgrades Tropical Depression Lola to a tropical disturbance.
0900 UTC - The JTWC issues its final advisory on dissipating Tropical Cyclone 25S.

March 25
0600 UTC - Météo-France re-upgrades Tropical Disturbance Lola to Tropical Depression Lola.
1200 UTC - Météo-France downgrades Tropical Depression Lola to a tropical disturbance.

March 26
1200 UTC - Météo-France downgrades Tropical Disturbance Lola to a zone of disturbed weather and issues its final advisory.

== See also ==
- List of Southern Hemisphere tropical cyclone seasons
- Atlantic hurricane season timelines: 2007, 2008
- Pacific hurricane season timelines: 2007, 2008
- Pacific typhoon season timelines: 2007, 2008
- North Indian Ocean cyclone season timelines: 2007, 2008
- Timeline of the 2007–08 South Pacific cyclone season
- Timeline of the 2007–08 Australian region cyclone season
