= Timeline of the 2008 Pacific hurricane season =

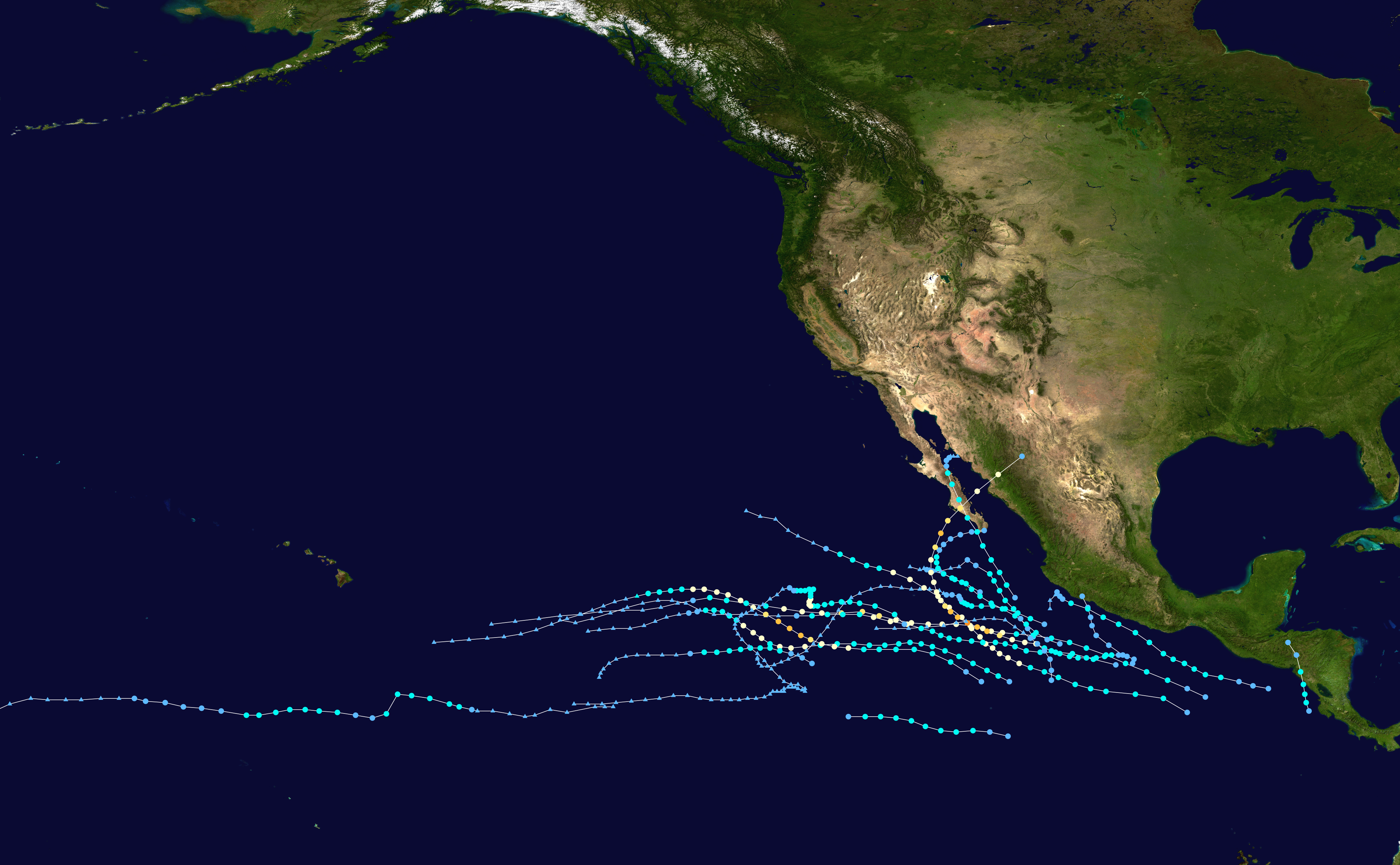
- Season summary map

Season boundaries
- First system formed: May 29, 2008
- Last system dissipated: November 5, 2008

Strongest system
- Name: Norbert
- Maximum winds: 130 mph (215 km/h) (1-minute sustained)
- Lowest pressure: 945 mbar (hPa; 27.91 inHg)

Longest lasting system
- Name: Kika
- Duration: 9 days
Storm articles
- Tropical Storm Alma
- Tropical Depression Five-E (2008)
- Tropical Storm Julio (2008)
- Tropical Storm Lowell (2008)
- Hurricane Norbert (2008)
- Tropical Storm Odile (2008)

The 2008 Pacific hurricane season officially started on May 15 in the East Pacific Ocean, and on June 1 in the Central Pacific; they both ended on November 30. These dates conventionally delimit the period of each year when most tropical cyclones form in the Pacific basin. The first storm of the year, Tropical Storm Alma, developed on May 29, and the last, Tropical Storm Polo dissipated on November 5.

This timeline documents all the storm formations, strengthening, weakening, landfalls, extratropical transitions, as well as dissipation. For convenience and clarity, in the timeline below, all landfalls are bolded. The timeline will also include information, when it becomes available, which was not operationally released, meaning that information from post-storm reviews by the National Hurricane Center, such as information on a storm that was not operationally warned on, have been included.

The graphical bar below gives a brief overview of storm activity during the season, and for convenience, the storm's maximum intensity is included as a color bar.

== Timeline ==
=== May ===
May 15

- The 2008 Eastern Pacific hurricane season officially begins.

May 29

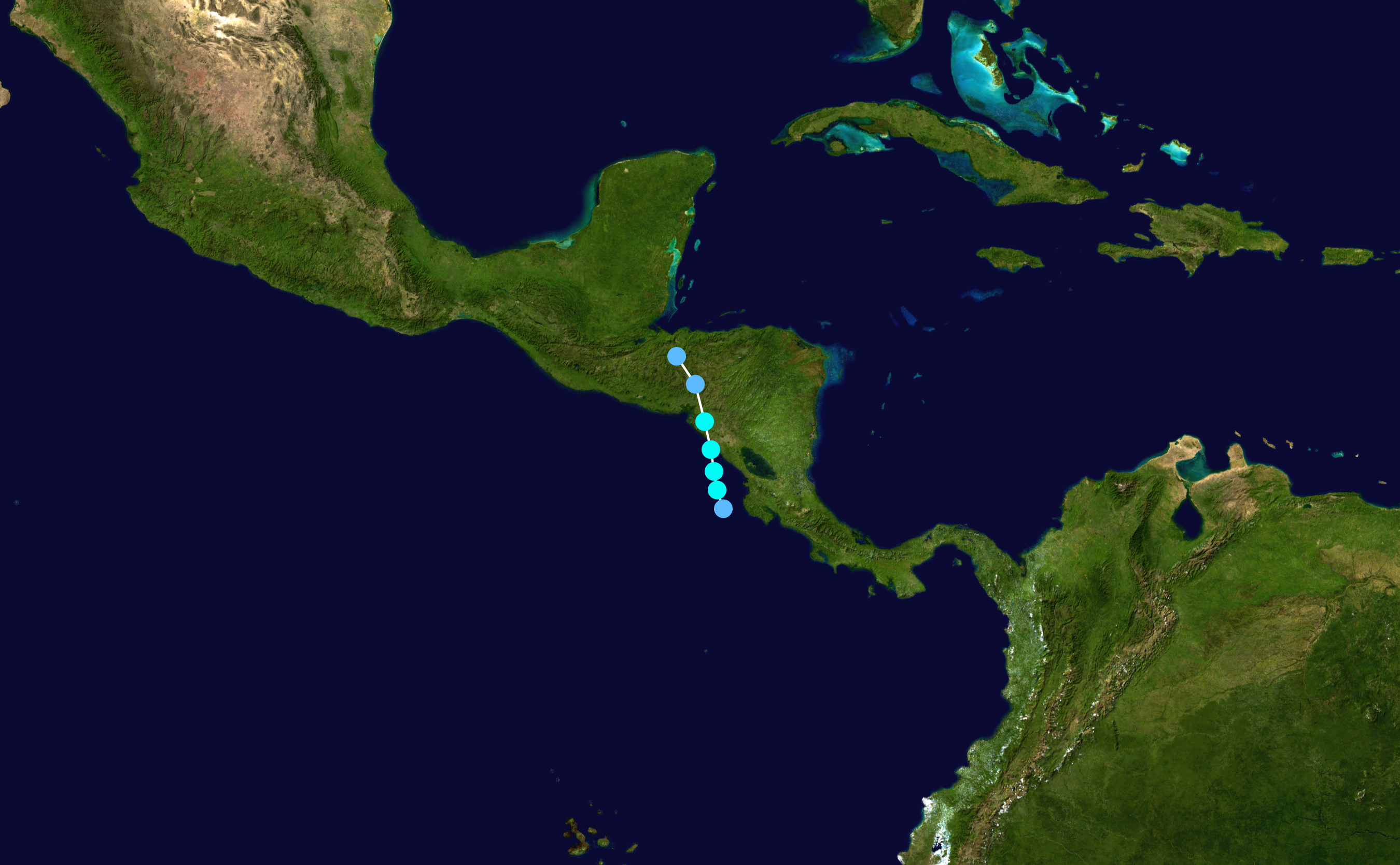
Track of Tropical Storm Alma

- 0000 UTC (5:00 p.m. PDT May 28) – Tropical Depression One-E forms 105 mi (169 km) west-northwest of Cabo Blanco, Costa Rica.
- 0600 UTC (11:00 p.m. May 28) – Tropical Depression One-E strengthens into Tropical Storm Alma.
- 1800 UTC (11:00 a.m.) – Tropical Storm Alma attains peak intensity with winds reaching 65 mph (105 km/h) and a central pressure of 994 mb (29.4 inHg).
- 1945 UTC (12:45 p.m.) – Tropical Storm Alma makes landfall near Leon, Nicaragua.

May 30

- 0600 UTC (11:00 p.m. May 29) – Tropical Storm Alma weakens into a tropical depression.
- 1800 UTC (11:00 p.m.) – Tropical Depression Alma dissipates.

=== June ===
June 1

- The Central Pacific hurricane season officially begins.

June 27

- 0600 UTC (11:00 p.m. PDT June 26) – Tropical Depression Two-E forms 570 mi (920 km) south-southwest of Manzanillo, Mexico.
- 1200 UTC (5:00 a.m. PDT) – Tropical Depression Two-E strengthens into Tropical Storm Boris.
- 1800 UTC (11:00 a.m. PDT) – Tropical Depression Three-E forms 1,075 mi (1,730 km) southwest of the southern tip of Baja California.

June 28

- 1200 UTC (5:00 a.m. PDT) – Tropical Depression Three-E strengthens into Tropical Storm Cristina.

June 29

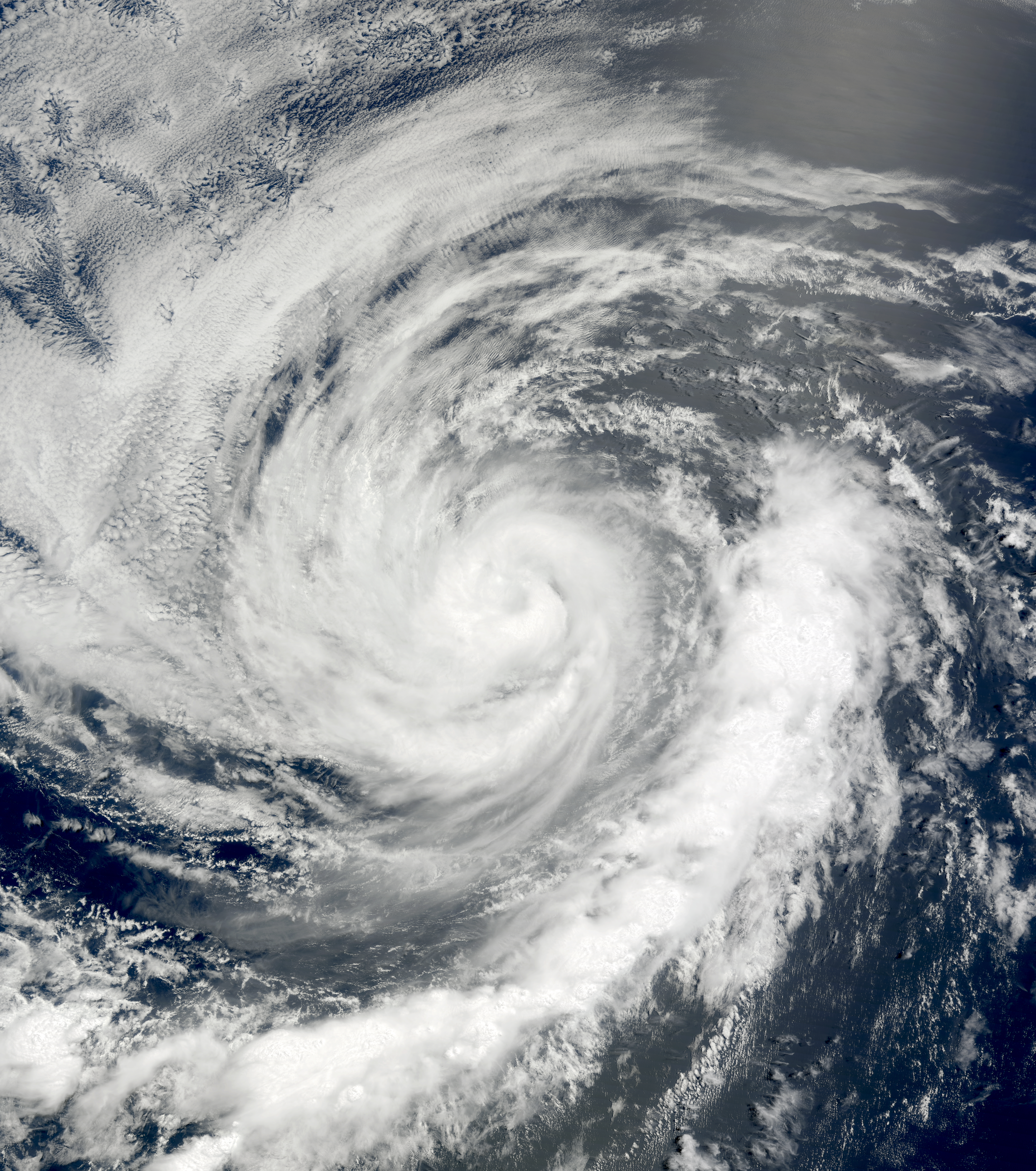
Hurricane Boris at peak intensity on July 1

- 0000 UTC (5:00 p.m. PDT July 28) – Tropical Storm Cristina attains peak intensity with winds reaching 50 mph (80 km/h) and a central pressure of 999 mb (29.5 inHg).

July 30

- 1200 UTC (5:00 a.m. PDT) – Tropical Storm Cristina weakens into a tropical depression.
- 1800 UTC (11:00 a.m. PDT) – Tropical Depression Cristina weakens into a remnant low.

=== July ===
July 1

- 0000 UTC (5:00 p.m. PDT June 30) – Tropical Storm Boris strengthens into a Category 1 hurricane.
- 1800 UTC (11:00 a.m. PDT) – Hurricane Boris weakens back to a tropical storm.
- 1800 UTC (11:00 a.m. PDT) – Tropical Depression Four-E forms 280 mi (450 km) southwest of Manzanillo, Mexico.

July 2

- 0000 UTC (5:00 p.m. PDT July 1) – Tropical Storm Boris reintensifies into a Category 1 hurricane.
- 0600 UTC (11:00 p.m. PDT July 1) – Hurricane Boris attains peak intensity with winds reaching 80 mph (130 km/h) and a central pressure of 985 mb (29.1 inHg).
- 1800 UTC (11:00 a.m. PDT) – Hurricane Boris weakens back to a tropical storm.
- 1800 UTC (11:00 a.m. PDT) – Tropical Depression Four-E strengthens into Tropical Storm Douglas. Simultaneously, Douglas attains peak intensity with winds reaching 40 mph (64 km/h) and a central pressure of 1,003 mb (29.6 inHg).

July 3

- 1800 UTC (11:00 a.m. PDT) – Tropical Storm Douglas weakens into a tropical depression.

July 4

- 0000 UTC (5:00 p.m. PDT July 3) – Tropical Storm Boris weakens into a tropical depression.
- 0600 UTC (11:00 p.m. PDT July 3) – Tropical Depression Douglas weakens into a remnant low.
- 1200 UTC (5:00 a.m. PDT) – Tropical Depression Boris weakens into a remnant low.

July 5

- 1800 UTC (11:00 a.m. PDT) – Tropical Depression Five-E forms 170 mi (270 km) south-southeast of Acapulco, Mexico.

July 6

- 1200 UTC (5:00 a.m. PDT) – Tropical Depression Five-E attains peak intensity with winds reaching 35 mph (56 km/h) and a central pressure of 1,005 mb (29.7 inHg).

July 7

- 1200 UTC (5:00 a.m. PDT) – Tropical Depression Five-E dissipates.

July 11

- 1800 UTC (11:00 a.m. PDT) – Tropical Depression Six-E forms 400 mi (640 km) southeast of Acapulco, Mexico.

July 12

- 0600 UTC (11:00 p.m. PDT July 11) – Tropical Depression Six-E strengthens into Tropical Storm Elida.

July 14

- 1200 UTC (5:00 a.m. PDT) – Tropical Storm Elida strengthens into a Category 1 hurricane.

July 16

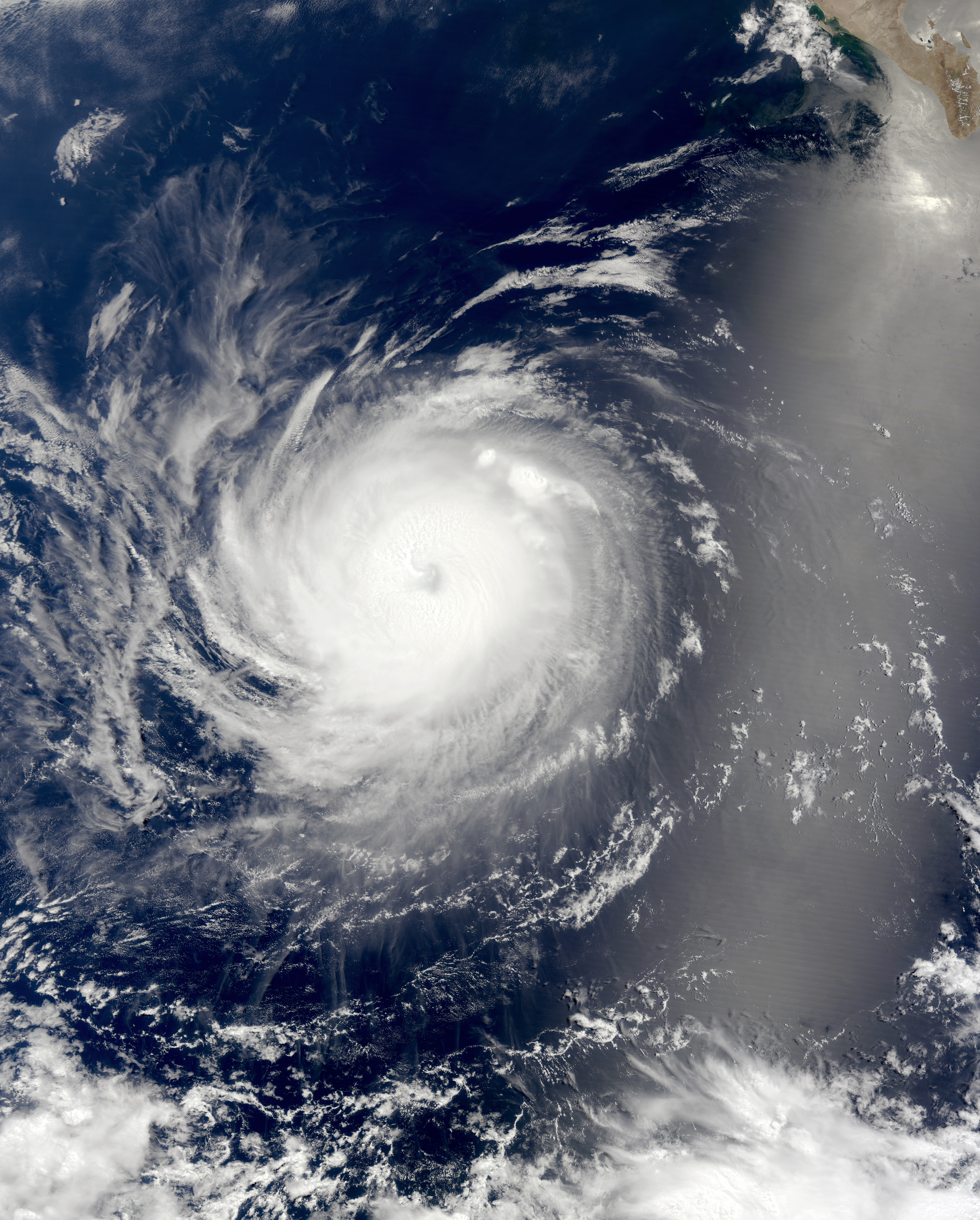
Hurricane Elida at peak intensity on July 16

- 0600 UTC (11:00 p.m. PDT July 15) – Tropical Depression Seven-E forms 560 mi (900 km) southeast of Acapulco, Mexico.
- 1200 UTC (5:00 a.m. PDT) – Tropical Depression Seven-E strengthens into Tropical Storm Fausto.
- 1800 UTC (11:00 a.m. PDT) – Hurricane Elida strengthens into a Category 2 hurricane. Simultaneously, Elida attains its peak intensity with winds reaching 105 mph (169 km/h) and a central pressure of 970 mb (29 inHg).

July 17

- 1200 UTC (5:00 a.m. PDT) – Hurricane Elida weakens into a Category 1 hurricane.

July 18

- 0600 UTC (11:00 p.m. PDT July 17) – Hurricane Elida weakens into a tropical storm.
- 1200 UTC (5:00 a.m. PDT) – Tropical Storm Fausto strengthens into a Category 1 hurricane.

July 19

- 0600 UTC (11:00 p.m. PDT July 18) – Tropical Storm Elida weakens into a tropical depression.
- 1200 UTC (5:00 a.m. PDT) – Tropical Depression Elida weakens into a remnant low.

July 20

- 1200 UTC (5:00 a.m. PDT) – Hurricane Fausto attains peak intensity with winds reaching 95 mph (153 km/h) and a central pressure of 977 mb (28.9 inHg).

July 21

- 1200 UTC (5:00 a.m. PDT) – Tropical Depression Eight-E forms 250 mi (400 km) south-southwest of Acapulco, Mexico.
- 1800 UTC (11:00 a.m. PDT) – Hurricane Fausto weakens into a tropical storm.
- 1800 UTC (11:00 a.m. PDT) – Tropical Depression Eight-E strengthens into Tropical Storm Genevieve.

July 22

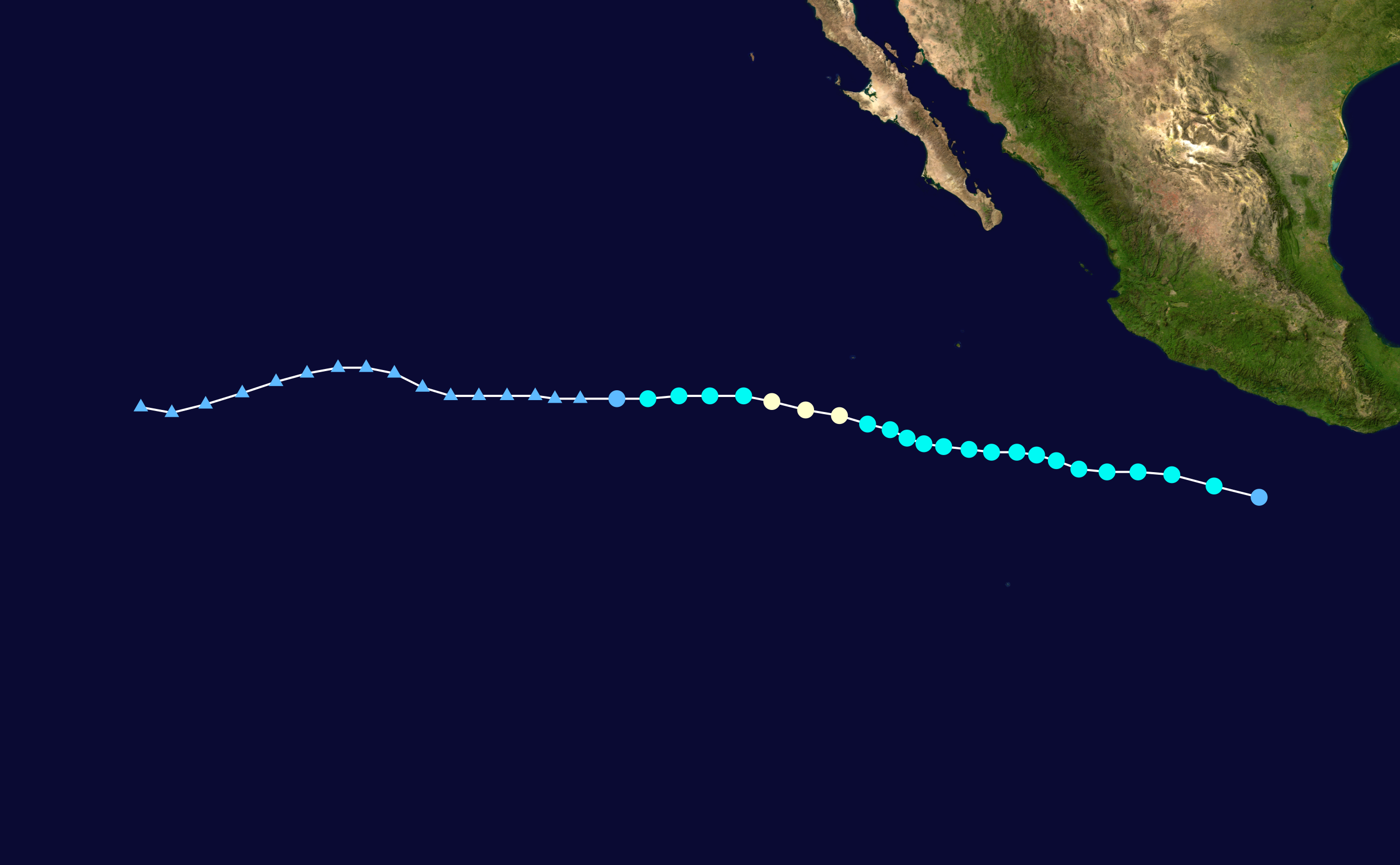
Track map of Hurricane Genevieve

- 1800 UTC (11:00 a.m. PDT) – Tropical Storm Fausto weakens into a tropical depression.

July 23

- 0000 UTC (5:00 p.m. PDT July 22) – Tropical Depression Fausto weakens into a remnant low.

July 25

- 1200 UTC (5:00 a.m. PDT) – Tropical Storm Genevieve strengthens into a Category 1 hurricane. Simultaneously, Genevieve attains peak intensity with winds reaching 75 mph (121 km/h) and a central pressure of 987 mb (29.1 inHg).

July 26

- 0600 UTC (11:00 p.m. PDT July 25) – Hurricane Genevieve weakens into a tropical storm.

July 27

- 0600 UTC (11:00 p.m. PDT July 26) – Tropical Storm Genevieve weakens into a tropical depression.
- 1200 UTC (5:00 a.m. PDT) – Tropical Depression Genevieve weakens into a remnant low.

=== August ===
August 6

- 1200 UTC (5:00 a.m. PDT) – Tropical Depression Nine-E forms 700 mi (1,100 km) south of Cabo San Lucas, Mexico.

August 7

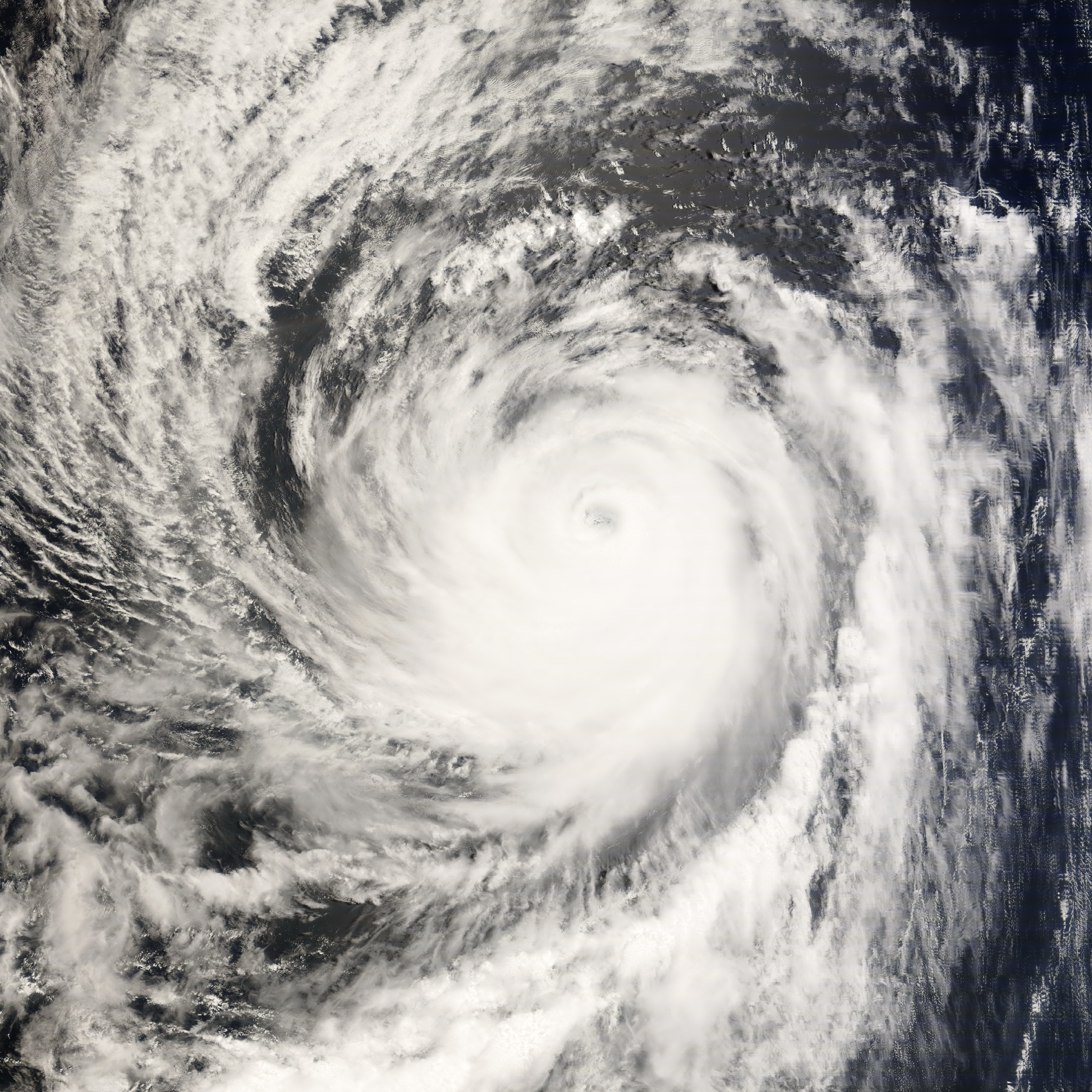
Hurricane Hernan as a major hurricane on August 9

- 0000 UTC (5:00 p.m. PDT August 6) – Tropical Depression Nine-E strengthens into Tropical Storm Hernan.
- 0000 UTC (2:00 p.m. PDT August 6) – Tropical Depression One-C forms 850 mi (1,370 km) southeast of Hilo, Hawaii.
- 0600 UTC (8:00 p.m. HST August 6) – Tropical Depression One-C strengthens into Tropical Storm Kika.
- 1800 UTC (8:00 a.m. HST) – Tropical Storm Kika attains peak intensity with winds reaching 40 mph (64 km/h) and a central pressure of 1,007 mb (29.7 inHg).

August 8

- 1200 UTC (5:00 a.m. PDT) – Tropical Storm Hernan strengthens into a Category 1 hurricane.
- 1800 UTC (8:00 a.m. PDT) – Tropical Storm Kika weakens into a tropical depression.

August 9

- 0600 UTC (11:00 p.m. PDT August 8) – Hurricane Hernan strengthens into a Category 2 hurricane.
- 0600 UTC (8:00 p.m. HST August 8) – Tropical Depression Kika restrengthens into a tropical storm.
- 1200 UTC (5:00 a.m. PDT) – Hurricane Hernan strengthens into a Category 3 major hurricane. Simultaneously, Hernan attains peak intensity with winds reaching 120 mph (190 km/h) and a central pressure of 956 mb (28.2 inHg).

August 10

- 0600 UTC (11:00 p.m. PDT August 9) – Hurricane Hernan weakens into a Category 2 hurricane.
- 1200 UTC (5:00 a.m. PDT) – Hurricane Hernan weakens into a Category 1 hurricane.

August 11

- 0000 UTC (2:00 p.m. HST August 10) – Tropical Storm Kika weakens back into a tropical depression.

August 12

- 0000 UTC (5:00 p.m. PDT August 11) – Hurricane Hernan weakens into a tropical storm.
- 1200 UTC (2:00 a.m. HST) – Tropical Depression Kika weakens into a tropical disturbance.

August 13

- 0000 UTC (5:00 p.m. PDT August 12) – Tropical Storm Hernan weakens into a remnant low.
- 1200 UTC (5:00 a.m. PDT) – Tropical Depression Ten-E forms 210 mi (340 km) south-southwest of Manzanillo, Mexico.
- 1800 UTC (11:00 a.m. PDT) – Tropical Depression Ten-E strengthens into Tropical Storm Iselle.

August 14

- 0600 UTC (8:00 p.m. PDT August 13) – Tropical Disturbance Kika moves west of the International Date Line.
- 1200 UTC (5:00 a.m. PDT) – Tropical Storm Iselle reaches peak intensity with winds reaching 50 mph (80 km/h) and a central pressure of 999 mb (29.5 inHg).

August 16

- 0000 UTC (5:00 p.m. PDT August 15) – Tropical Storm Iselle weakens into a tropical depression.

August 17

- 0000 UTC (5:00 p.m. PDT August 16) – Tropical Depression Iselle weakens into a remnant low.

August 23

- 1200 UTC (5:00 a.m. PDT) – Tropical Depression Eleven-E forms 345 mi (555 km) south-southeast of the southern tip of Baja California.
- 1800 UTC (11:00 a.m. PDT) – Tropical Depression Eleven-E strengthens into Tropical Storm Julio.

August 24

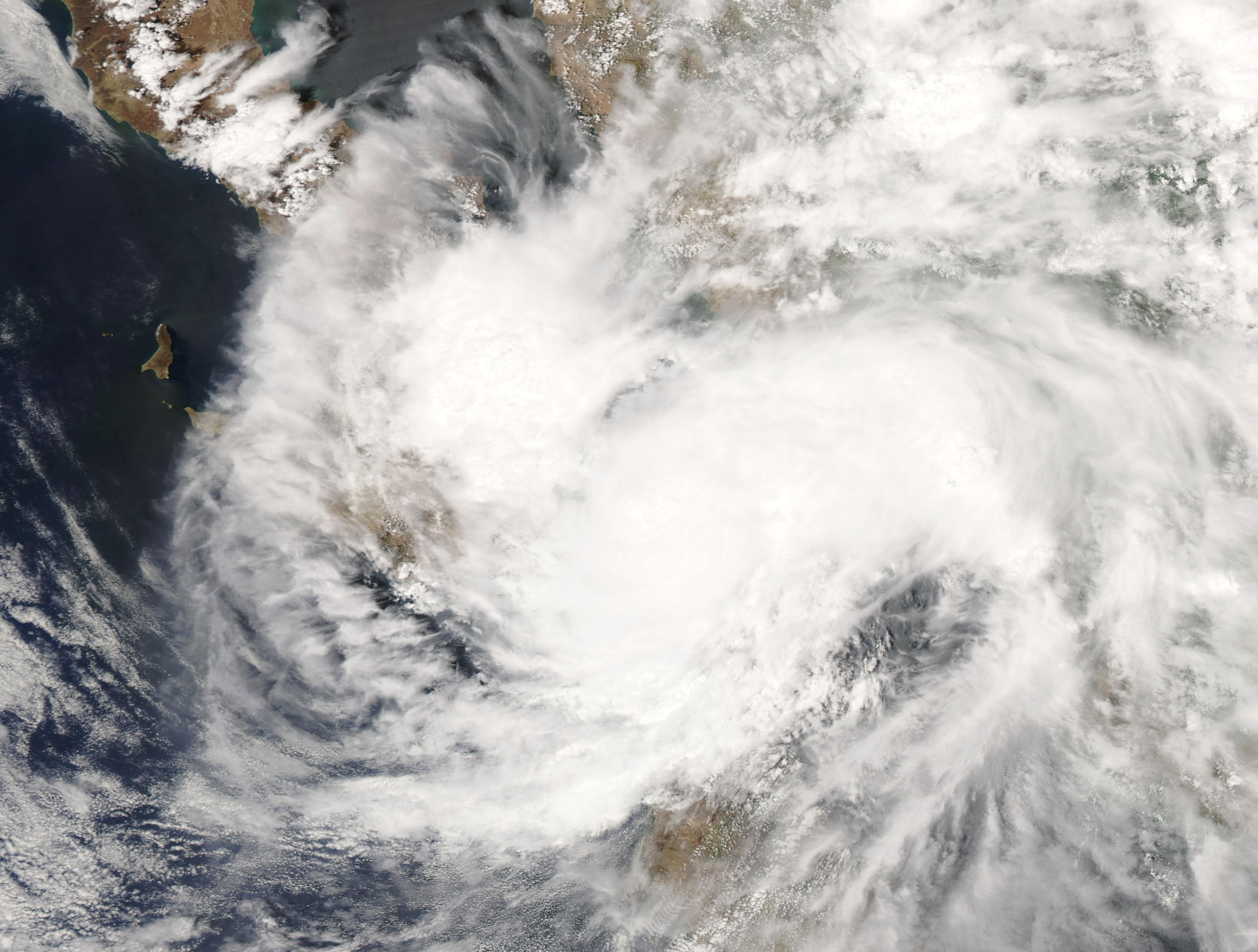
Julio over the Baja California peninsula

- 1800 UTC (11:00 a.m. PDT) – Tropical Storm Julio attains peak intensity with winds reaching 50 mph (80 km/h) and a central pressure of 998 mb (29.5 inHg).

August 25

- 0000 UTC (5:00 p.m. PDT August 24) – Tropical Storm Julio makes landfall near La Paz, Mexico with winds of 45 mph (72 km/h).

August 26

- 0000 UTC (5:00 p.m. PDT August 25) – Tropical Storm Julio weakens into a tropical depression.
- 1800 UTC (11:00 a.m. PDT) – Tropical Depression Julio weakens into a remnant low.

=== September ===
September 2

- 0600 UTC (11:00 p.m. PDT September 1) – Tropical Depression Twelve-E forms 265 mi (426 km) south-southwest of the southern tip of Baja California.
- 1200 UTC (5:00 a.m. PDT) – Tropical Depression Twelve-E strengthens into Tropical Storm Karina. Simultaneously, Karina attains peak intensity with winds reaching 40 mph (64 km/h) and a central pressure of 1,000 mb (30 inHg).

September 3

- 0000 UTC (5:00 p.m. PDT September 2) – Tropical Storm Karina weakens into a tropical depression.
- 1800 UTC (11:00 a.m. PDT) – Tropical Depression Karina weakens into a remnant low.

September 6

- 1200 UTC (5:00 a.m. PDT) – Tropical Depression Thirteen-E forms 265 mi (426 km) south-southwest of Manzanillo, Mexico.

September 7

- 0000 UTC (5:00 p.m. PDT September 6) – Tropical Depression Thirteen-E strengthens into Tropical Storm Lowell.
- 1200 UTC (5:00 a.m. PDT) – Tropical Storm Lowell attains peak intensity with winds reaching 50 mph (80 km/h) and a central pressure of 998 mb (29.5 inHg).

September 10

- 0600 UTC (11:00 p.m. PDT September 9) – Tropical Storm Lowell weakens into a tropical depression.

September 11

- 0900 UTC (2:00 a.m. PDT) – Tropical Depression Lowell makes landfall near Cabo San Lucas, Mexico with winds of 35 mph (56 km/h)
- 1800 UTC (11:00 a.m. PDT) – Tropical Depression Lowell dissipates.

=== October ===
October 1

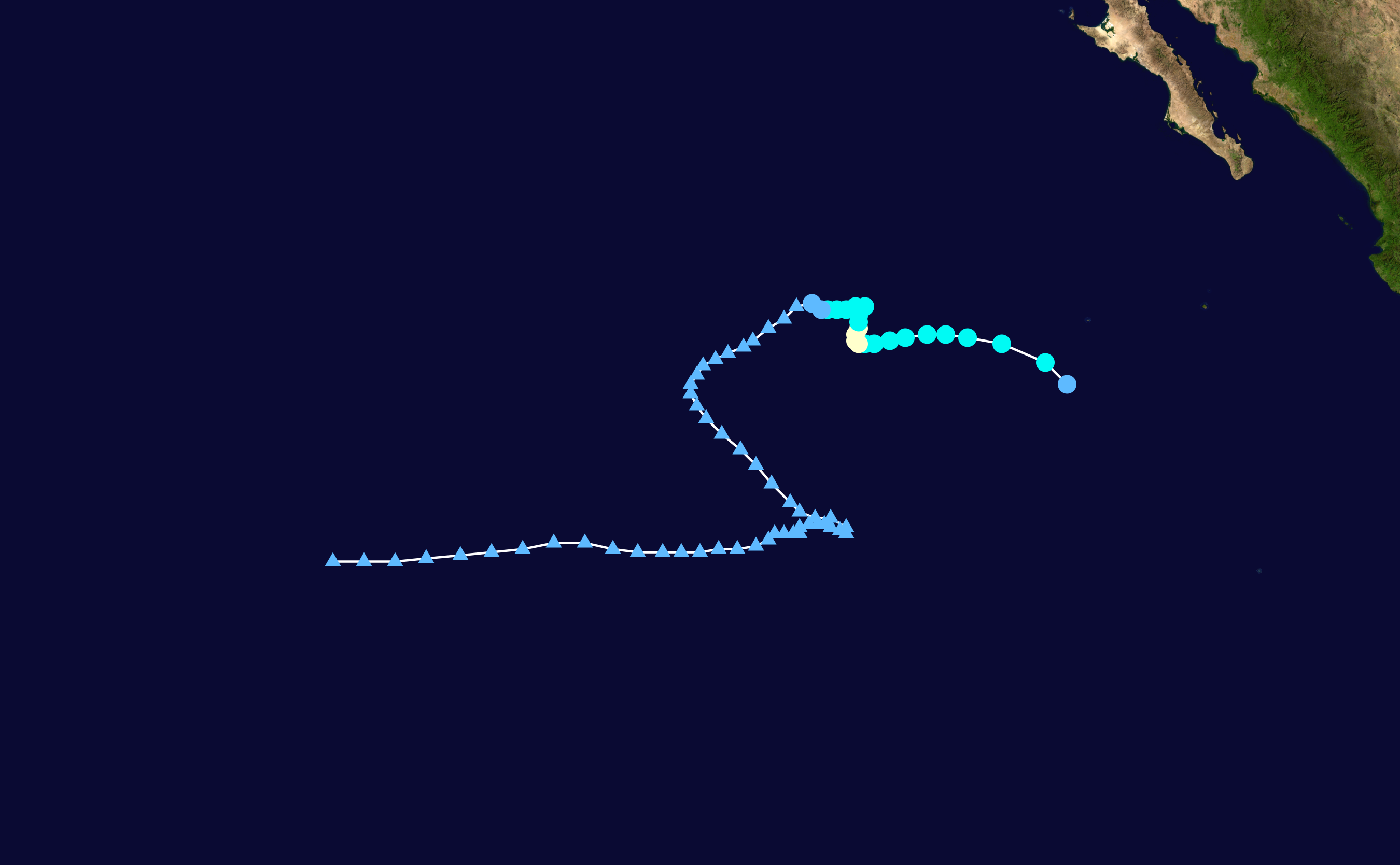
Track map of Hurricane Marie

- 0600 UTC (11:00 p.m. PDT September 30) – Tropical Depression Fourteen-E forms 590 mi (950 km) south-southwest of the southern tip of Baja California.
- 1200 UTC (5:00 a.m. PDT) – Tropical Depression Fourteen-E strengthens into Tropical Storm Marie.

October 3

- 1800 UTC (11:00 a.m. PDT) – Tropical Storm Marie strengthens into a Category 1 hurricane.

October 4

- 0000 UTC (5:00 p.m. PDT October 3) – Hurricane Marie attains peak intensity with winds reaching 80 mph (130 km/h) and a central pressure of 984 mb (29.1 inHg).
- 0000 UTC (5:00 p.m. PDT October 3) – Tropical Depression Fifteen-E forms 230 mi (370 km) south of Acapulco, Mexico.
- 1800 UTC (11:00 a.m. PDT) – Hurricane Marie weakens into a tropical storm.

October 5

- 0000 UTC (5:00 p.m. PDT October 4) – Tropical Depression Fifteen-E strengthens into Tropical Storm Norbert.

October 6

- 1200 UTC (5:00 a.m. PDT) – Tropical Storm Marie weakens into a tropical depression.

October 7

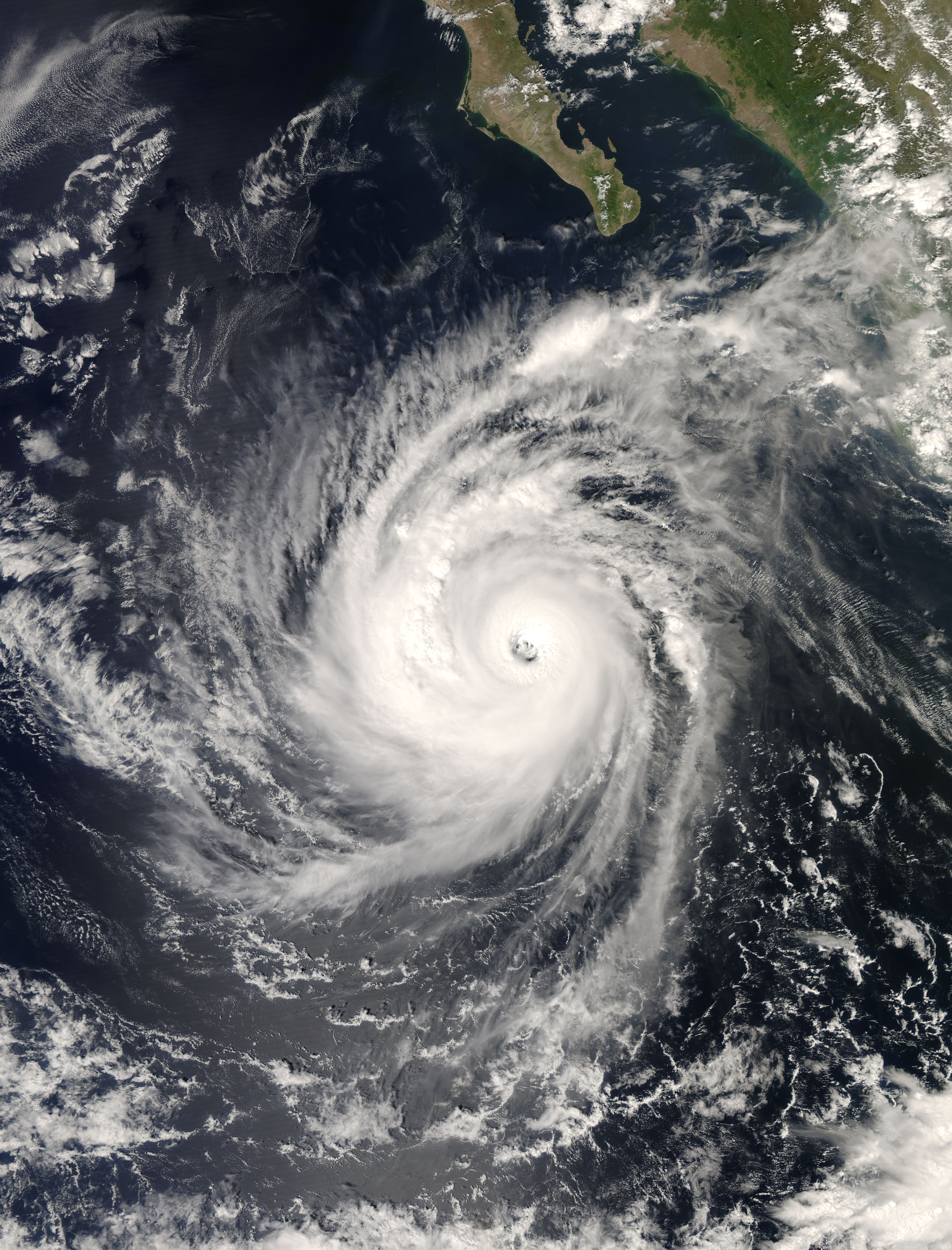
Hurricane Norbert at peak intensity as a Category 4 hurricane

- 0000 UTC (5:00 p.m. PDT October 6) – Tropical Depression Marie weakens into a remnant low.
- 0600 UTC (11:00 p.m. PDT October 6) – Tropical Storm Norbert strengthens into a Category 1 hurricane.

October 8

- 0000 UTC (5:00 p.m. PDT October 7) – Hurricane Norbert strengthens into a Category 2 hurricane.
- 0600 UTC (11:00 p.m. PDT October 7) – Hurricane Norbert strengthens into a Category 3 major hurricane.
- 1200 UTC (5:00 a.m. PDT) – Tropical Depression Sixteen-E forms 160 mi (260 km) southwest of San Salvador, El Salvador.
- 1800 UTC (11:00 a.m. PDT) – Hurricane Norbert strengthens into a Category 4 major hurricane. Simultaneously, Norbert attains peak intensity with winds reaching 130 mph (210 km/h) and a central pressure of 945 mb (27.9 inHg).

October 9

- 0000 UTC (5:00 p.m. PDT October 8) – Hurricane Norbert weakens into a Category 3 major hurricane.
- 0600 UTC (11:00 p.m. PDT October 8) – Tropical Depression Sixteen-E strengthens into Tropical Storm Odile.
- 1200 UTC (5:00 a.m. PDT) – Hurricane Norbert weakens into a Category 2 hurricane.
- 1800 UTC (11:00 a.m. PDT) – Hurricane Norbert weakens into a Category 1 hurricane.

October 11

- 0000 UTC (5:00 p.m. PDT October 10) – Hurricane Norbert restrengthens into a Category 2 hurricane.
- 0600 UTC (11:00 a.m. PDT October 10) – Hurricane Norbert restrengthens into a Category 3 major hurricane.
- 0600 UTC (11:00 a.m. PDT October 10) – Tropical Storm Odile attains peak intensity with winds reaching 60 mph (97 km/h) and a central pressure of 997 mb (29.4 inHg).
- 1200 UTC (5:00 a.m. PDT) – Hurricane Norbert weakens back into a Category 2 hurricane.
- 1630 UTC (9:30 a.m. PDT) – Hurricane Norbert makes first landfall near Puerto Chale, Mexico with winds of 105 mph (169 km/h).

October 12

- 0000 UTC (5:00 p.m. PDT October 11) – Hurricane Norbert weakens back into a Category 1 hurricane.
- 0400 UTC (9:00 p.m. PDT October 11) – Hurricane Norbert makes second landfall near Huatabampo, Mexico with winds of 85 mph (137 km/h).
- 0600 UTC (11:00 p.m. PDT October 11) – Tropical Storm Odile weakens into a tropical depression.
- 0700 UTC (12:00 a.m. PDT) – Hurricane Norbert weakens into a tropical storm.
- 1200 UTC (5:00 a.m. PDT) – Tropical Storm Norbert weakens into a tropical depression.
- 1800 UTC (11:00 a.m. PDT) – Tropical Depression Norbert dissipates.

October 13

- 0000 UTC (5:00 p.m. PDT) – Tropical Depression Odile weakens into a remnant low.

October 23

- 0600 UTC (11:00 p.m. PDT October 22) – Tropical Depression Seventeen-E forms 410 mi (660 km) south of Manzanillo, Mexico.

October 24

- 1800 UTC (11:00 a.m. PDT) – Tropical Depression Seventeen-E weakens into a remnant low.

=== November ===
November 2

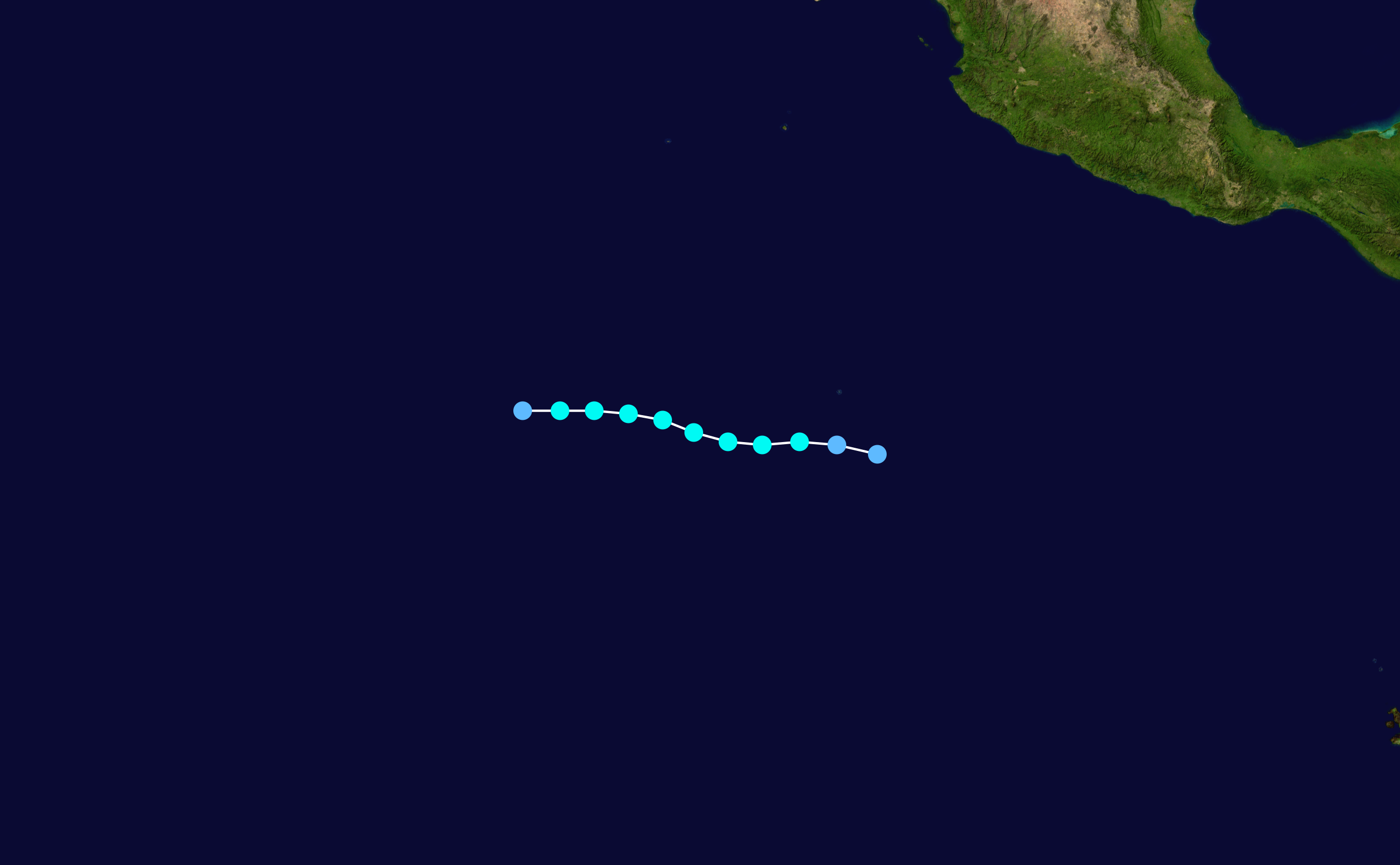
Track map of Tropical Storm Polo

- 1200 UTC (5:00 a.m. PDT) – Tropical Depression Eighteen-E forms 990 mi (1,590 km) south of the southern tip of Baja California.

November 3

- 0000 UTC (5:00 p.m. PDT November 2) – Tropical Depression Eighteen-E strengthens into Tropical Storm Polo.
- 0600 UTC (11:00 p.m. PDT November 2) – Tropical Storm Polo attains peak intensity with winds reaching 40 mph (64 km/h) and a central pressure of 1,003 mb (29.6 inHg).

November 5

- 0000 UTC (5:00 p.m. PDT November 4) – Tropical Storm Polo weakens into a tropical depression.
- 0600 UTC (11:00 p.m. PDT November 4) – Tropical Depression Polo dissipates.

November 30

- The 2008 Central and Eastern Pacific hurricane seasons end.

== See also ==
- Timeline of the 2008 Atlantic hurricane season
- Timeline of the 2008 Pacific typhoon season
- Timeline of the 2008 North Indian Ocean cyclone season
- South-West Indian Ocean cyclone seasons: 2007–08, 2008–09
- Australian region cyclone seasons: 2007–08, 2008–09
- South Pacific cyclone seasons:2007–08, 2008–09
