= Timeline of the 2007–08 Australian region cyclone season =

Timeline of the 2007-08 Australian region cyclone season
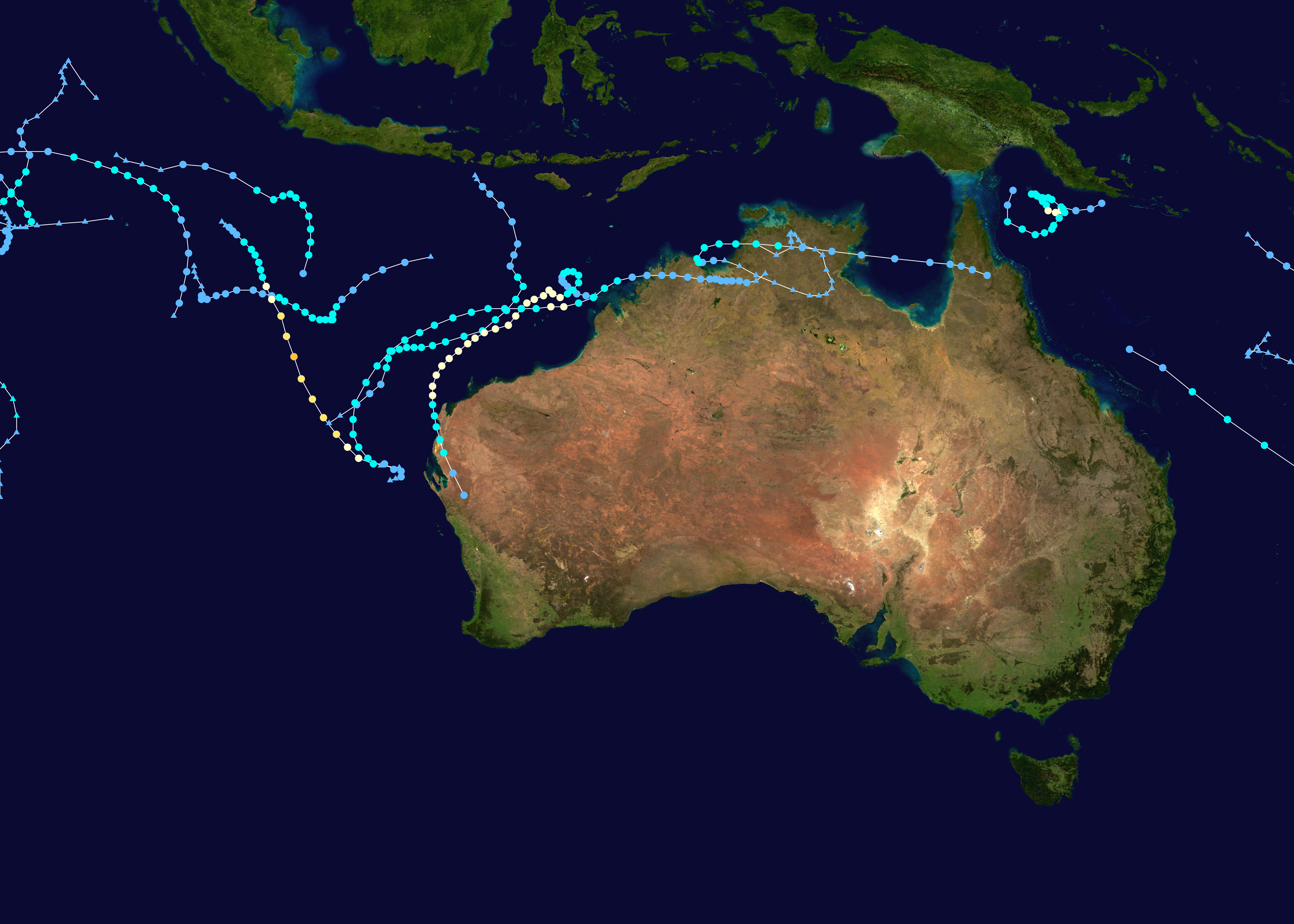
- Season summary map

Season boundaries
- First system formed: 29 July 2007
- Last system dissipated: 26 April 2008

Strongest system
- Name: Pancho
- Maximum winds: 165 km/h (105 mph) (10-minute sustained)
- Lowest pressure: 938 hPa (mbar)

Longest lasting system
- Name: Nicholas
- Duration: 10 days
Storm articles
- Cyclone Guba
- Cyclone Helen (2008)

The 2007–08 Australian region cyclone season was only the second season to have a tropical cyclone form in July. This timeline documents all the storm formations, strengthening, weakening, landfalls, extratropical transitions, as well as dissipation. The season officially began on 1 November 2007, and lasted until 30 April 2008. However a tropical cyclone moving into the region from the South-West Indian Ocean cyclone season on 29 July, meant that the season started 29 days after the Southern Hemisphere tropical cyclone year started on 1 July 2007. The timeline includes information which was not operationally released, meaning that information from post-storm reviews by the Australian Bureau of Meteorology, such as information about a Cyclone that was not upgraded operationally, has been included.

== Timeline of storms ==
=== Preseason ===
1 July
0000 UTC – The 2007–08 Tropical Cyclone year begins.

29 July
1800 UTC – Tropical Cyclone 01, moves in to the east of 90E and into the area of Tropical Cyclone Warning Center in Perth's area of responsibility, from RSMC La Réunion's area of responsibility.
2100 UTC – The Joint Typhoon Warning Center designates Tropical Cyclone 01 as Tropical Cyclone 01S.

30 July
0400 UTC – The Tropical Cyclone Warning Center in Perth operationally issues its first warning on Tropical Cyclone 01S, designating it as a Tropical Low.
0900 UTC – The Joint Typhoon Warning Center issues its final advisory on Tropical Cyclone 01S as it begins to dissipate 310 km west of the Cocos Islands.
1200 UTC – The Tropical Cyclone Warning Center in Perth reports in their Tropical cyclone report that Tropical Cyclone 01S weakened into a tropical low.

31 July
0600 UTC – The Tropical Cyclone Warning Center in Perth operationally issues its last warning on Tropical Low 01S, as it moves back into RSMC La Réunion's area of responsibility.

- There were no other tropical cyclones in the Australian region during the pre season.

=== November ===
13 November
0000 UTC – The Tropical Cyclone Warning Center in Brisbane reports that a Tropical Low has formed, near south-eastern New Guinea.
0600 UTC – The Tropical Cyclone Warning Center in Perth reports that a Tropical Low has formed, to the southwest of Sumatra.
1500 UTC – The Joint Typhoon Warning Center designates the Tropical low that was previously located to the near south-eastern New Guinea as Tropical Cyclone 02P.

14 November
0300 UTC – The Tropical Cyclone Warning Center in Brisbane reports that the Tropical Cyclone Warning Center in Port Moresby has named Tropical Cyclone 02S as Tropical Cyclone Guba.
1200 UTC – TCWC Perth upgrades the Tropical Low that was previously located to the southwest of Sumatra to Tropical Cyclone Lee.
2100 UTC – The Joint Typhoon Warning Center designates Tropical Cyclone Lee as Tropical Cyclone 03S.

15 November
0000 UTC – Tropical Cyclone Lee intensifies into a category 2 tropical cyclone.
0600 UTC – TCWC Perth issues its last advisory on Tropical Cyclone Lee, as it moves west of 90°E into RSMC La Réunion's area of responsibility, and is renamed Severe Tropical Storm Ariel.

16 November
0000 UTC – Tropical Cyclone Guba intensifies into a category 2 tropical cyclone.
1200 UTC – Tropical Cyclone Guba intensifies into a category 3 severe tropical cyclone.

17 November
1200 UTC – Severe Tropical Cyclone Guba weakens into a category 2 tropical cyclone.

18 November
0000 UTC – Tropical Cyclone Guba weakens into a category 1 tropical cyclone.

19 November
2100 UTC – The Tropical Cyclone Warning Center in Brisbane issues its last warning on Tropical cyclone Guba as it weakens into a tropical low.

=== December ===
26 December
1800 UTC – A developing Tropical Low forms to the south of Sumba island.

27 December
0600 UTC – The Tropical Cyclone Warning Center in Perth issues its first warning for the developing Tropical Low previously located to the south of Sumba island.

28 December
0000 UTC – The Tropical Cyclone Warning Center in Perth upgrades the developing Tropical Low previously located to the south of Sumba island to Tropical Cyclone Melanie.
0900 UTC – The Joint Typhoon Warning Center designates Tropical Cyclone Melanie as Tropical Cyclone 08S.
1800 UTC – Tropical Cyclone Melanie intensifies into a category 2 cyclone.

31 December
0000 UTC – The Tropical Cyclone Warning Center in Perth reports that a Tropical Low has formed to the northwest of the Cocos Islands.
0600 UTC – Tropical Cyclone Melanie weakens into a category 1 cyclone.

=== January ===
1 January
1800 UTC – Tropical Cyclone Melanie weakens into a Tropical Low.

2 January
0600 UTC – The Tropical Cyclone Warning Center in Perth issues its final warning on Tropical Low Ex Melanie as it Melanie had dissipated.

3 January
0000 UTC – The Tropical Cyclone Warning Center in Darwin reports that a tropical low has formed to the northeast of Wyndham.
2100 UTC – The Joint Typhoon Warning Center designates the Tropical Low previously located to the northeast of Wyndham as Tropical Cyclone 10S and issues its first advisory.

4 January
0000 UTC – The Tropical Cyclone Warning Center in Darwin, previously located to the northeast of Wyndham as Tropical Cyclone Helen.
1200 UTC – Tropical Cyclone Helen Intenisfies into a Category two cyclone.
1800 UTC – Tropical Cyclone Helen weakens into a category one cyclone.
2100 UTC – Tropical Cyclone Helen weakens into a tropical low.

6 January
0900 UTC – JTWC issues its final advisory on Tropical Cyclone 10S (Helen).

=== February ===
4 February
0600 UTC – TCWC Perth designates 92S.INVEST as tropical low.|:2200 UTC – TCWC Perth issues its last shipping warning associated with the low.

8 February
0600 UTC – TCWC Perth re-issues shipping warnings on the tropical low.

10 February
0000 UTC – TCWC Perth issues its last shipping warning associated with the low.

10 February
0000 UTC – TCWC Perth begins shipping warnings on 98S.INVEST, a new tropical low located 60 kilometres south-southeast of Kuri Bay.

13 February
0000 UTC – TCWC Perth upgrades the tropical low 430 km northwest of Broome as Tropical Cyclone Nicholas.

16 February
0600 UTC – TCWC Perth upgrades Tropical Cyclone Nicholas to Severe Tropical Cyclone Nicholas.

18 February
0600 UTC – TCWC Perth downgrades Severe Tropical Cyclone Nicholas to a tropical cyclone.

20 February
0300 UTC – Tropical Cyclone Nicholas makes landfall north of Carnarvon.|:0600 UTC – TCWC Perth downgrades Tropical Cyclone Nicholas to a tropical low.

27 February
0600 UTC – TCWC Darwin identifies a tropical low near the Northern Territory.

29 February
0900 UTC – The JTWC designates an area northeast of Australia as Tropical Cyclone 20P.|:2100 UTC – The JTWC issues its last advisory on Tropical Cyclone 20P as it becomes extratropical.

=== March ===
1 March
0900 UTC – The JTWC designates the tropical low as Tropical Cyclone 21S.|:1200 UTC – TCWC Perth upgrades Tropical Cyclone 21S, 245 km north of Broome, to Tropical Cyclone Ophelia.

6 March
2100 UTC – The JTWC issues its last advisory on dissipating Tropical Cyclone Ophelia.

7 March
0000 UTC – TCWC Perth issues its last advisory on Tropical Cyclone Ophelia.

24 March
0200 UTC – TCWC Perth designates 97S.INVEST as a Tropical Low.|:1200 UTC – The JTWC designates the tropical low as Tropical Cyclone 26S.

25 March
0600 UTC – TCWC Perth upgrades the Tropical Low east-southeast of Cocos Island as Tropical Cyclone Pancho.

26 March
1200 UTC – TCWC Perth upgrades Tropical Cyclone Pancho to Severe Tropical Cyclone Pancho.

28 March
1200 UTC – TCWC Perth downgrades Severe Tropical Cyclone Pancho to a tropical cyclone.

29 March
0300 UTC – TCWC Perth downgrades Tropical Cyclone Pancho to a tropical low and issues its final warning.|:0900 UTC – The JTWC issues their final warning on Tropical Cyclone 26S.

=== April ===
20 April
1200 UTC – TCWC Jakarta reports that a tropical low has formed about 1,000 km (620 mi) to the west-southwest of Jakarta.

21 April
1200 UTC – In their post storm review the Tropical Cyclone Warning Center in Perth reports that the Tropical Depression previously located about 500 nautical miles (1000 kilometres) to the south east of Jakarta, Indonesia, has intensified into a tropical cyclone but is not upgraded at this time operationally.

22 April
0000 UTC – The Tropical Depression previously located about 500 nautical miles (1000 kilometres) to the south east of Jakarta, Indonesia, moves south of 10S and into the Tropical Cyclone Warning Center in Perth's area of responsibility and is upgraded to Tropical Cyclone Rosie.
0600 UTC – TCWC Perth reports that the tropical depression has moved into TCWC Jakarta's area of responsibility and developed into a category one tropical cyclone.
1200 UTC – TCWC Perth reports that the tropical cyclone has intensified into a category two tropical cyclone.

23 April
0000 UTC – TCWC Jakarta names the tropical cyclone, Durga.
1200 UTC – TCWC Perth reports that Tropical Cyclone Rosie, has weakened into a tropical low.

25 April
0600 UTC – TCWC Perth reports that Tropical Cyclone Durga, has weakened into a tropical low.
1800 UTC – TCWC Perth reports that Tropical Low Durga has dissipated.

=== Postseason ===
1 May
The 2007–08 Australian region cyclone season officially ends.

30 June
The 2007–08 Tropical Cyclone Year ends after no tropical cyclones have developed during the post season.

== See also ==
- 2007–08 Australian region cyclone season
- List of Southern Hemisphere tropical cyclone seasons
- Atlantic hurricane season timelines: 2007, 2008
- Pacific hurricane season timelines: 2007, 2008
- Pacific typhoon season timelines: 2007, 2008
- North Indian Ocean cyclone season timelines: 2007, 2008
- Timeline of the 2007–08 South-West Indian Ocean cyclone season
- Timeline of the 2007–08 South Pacific cyclone season
