= Timeline of the 2007 North Indian Ocean cyclone season =

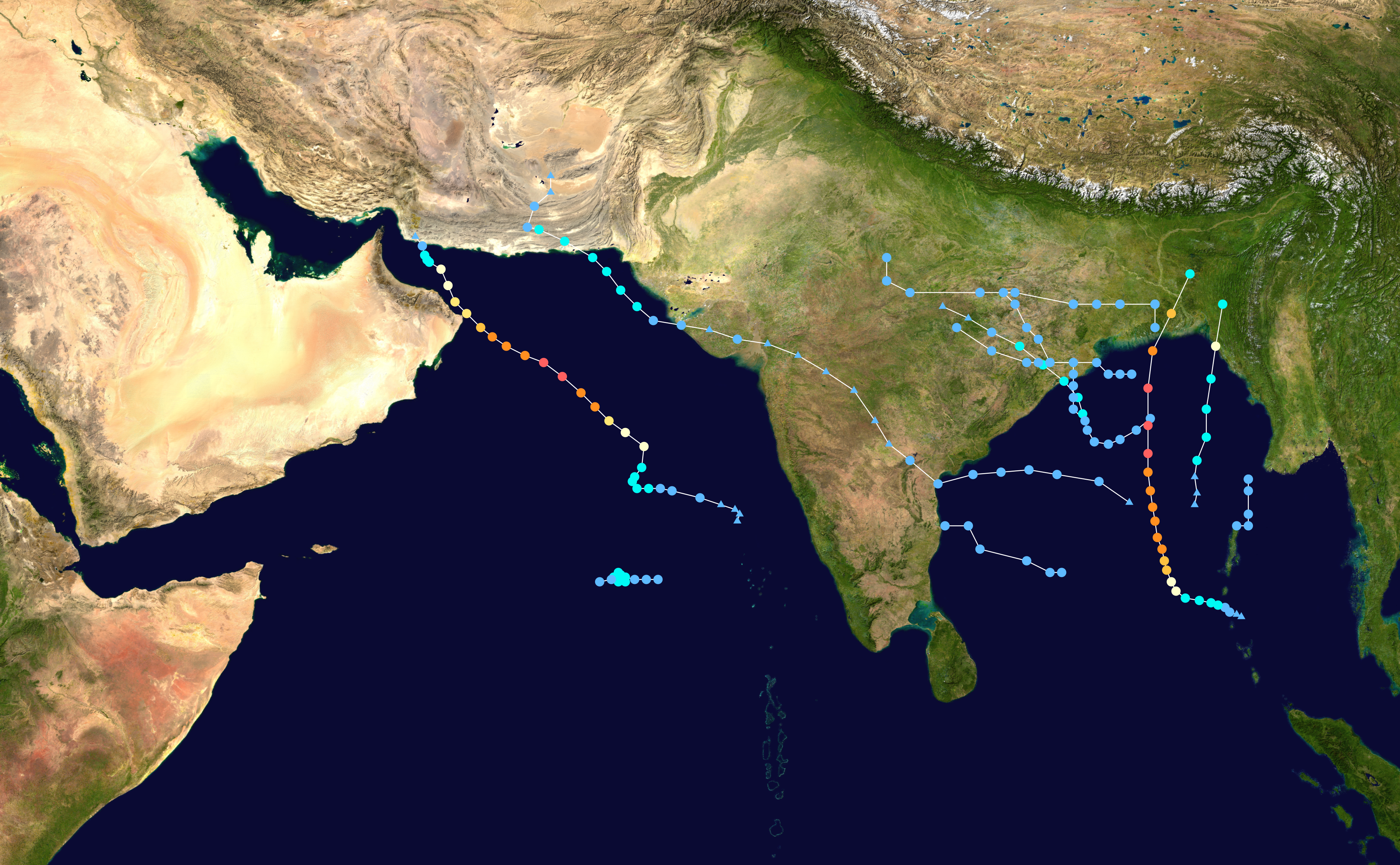
- Season summary map

Season boundaries
- First system formed: May 1, 2007
- Last system dissipated: November 16, 2007

Strongest system
- Name: Gonu
- Maximum winds: 240 km/h (150 mph) (3-minute sustained)
- Lowest pressure: 920 hPa (mbar)

Longest lasting system
- Name: ARB 02
- Duration: 7 days
Storm articles
- Cyclone Akash
- Cyclone Gonu
- Cyclone Yemyin
- Cyclone Sidr

This is a timeline of the 2007 North Indian Ocean cyclone season, documenting major events regarding tropical cyclone formation, strengthening, weakening, landfall, extratropical transition, as well as dissipation.

In the timeline all landfalls are bolded. Where the exact time of an event is unclear, c. is used to denote the approximate time.

The India Meteorological Department (IMD) is the official Regional Specialized Meteorological Centre in this basin, while the Joint Typhoon Warning Center releases unofficial advisories.

Storms tracked by the JTWC are referred to numerically to avoid confusion as the JTWC sometimes recognises a storm at a different intensity compared to the IMD.

The graphical bar gives a brief overview of storm activity during the season, and a storm's maximum intensity category in terms of wind speed is included as a colour bar. This is given by the IMD's values of maximum 10-minute sustained winds. The colour scheme is detailed to the right.

== Timeline of storms ==
=== January to April ===
- There were no Cyclonic Disturbances reported in the North Indian Ocean between January and April 2007.

=== May ===
May 3

- 1200 UTC, (1730 IST) — The IMD reports that Depression BOB 01 has formed about 210 km, (130 mi), to the north of Port Blair in the Andaman islands.

May 5

- 0300 UTC, (1730 IST) — The IMD reports that Depression BOB 01 has made landfall on the Arakan coast, Myanmar and has dissipated.

May 13

- 0300 UTC, (1730 IST) — The IMD reports that Depression BOB 02 has formed about 445 km to the northeast of Port Blair in the Andaman islands.
- 1800 UTC, (2330 IST) — The JTWC designates Depression BOB 02 as Tropical Storm 01B.
- 2100 UTC, (0200 IST, May 14) — The IMD reports that Depression BOB 02 (01B), has intensified into a deep depression.

May 14

- 0300 UTC, (0730 IST) — The IMD reports that Depression BOB 02 (01B), has intensified into a cyclonic storm and names it as Akash.
- 0600 UTC, (1130 IST) — The IMD reports that Cyclonic Storm Akash (01B), has reached its 3-minute peak sustained wind speeds of 80 km/h, (50 mph).
- 1800 UTC, (2330 IST) — The JTWC reports that Tropical Storm Akash (01B), has strengthened into a category 1 tropical cyclone.
- 1800 UTC, (2330 IST) — The JTWC reports that Tropical Storm Akash (01B), has reached its 1-minute peak sustained wind speeds of 120 km/h, (75 mph).
- 2300 UTC, (0430 IST, May 15) — The IMD reports that Cyclonic Storm Akash (01B), has made landfall to the south of Cox's Bazar, Bangladesh.

May 15

- 0000 UTC, (0530 IST) — The IMD reports that Cyclonic Storm Akash (01B), has rapidly weakened into a depression and issues its final advisory.

=== June ===
June 1

- 0600 UTC, (1130 IST) — The JTWC reports that Tropical Depression 02A has formed about 560 km, (350 mi), to the southwest of Mumbai, India.
- 1800 UTC, (2330 IST) — The IMD designates Tropical Cyclone 02A as Depression ARB 01.

June 2

- 0300 UTC, (0830 IST) — The IMD reports that Depression ARB 01 (02A), has intensified into a Deep Depression.
- 0900 UTC, (1430 IST) — The IMD reports that Deep Depression ARB 01 (02A), has intensified into a Cyclonic Storm and names it Gonu.

June 3

- 0000 UTC, (0530 IST) — The IMD reports that Cyclonic Storm Gonu (02A), has intensified into a Severe Cyclonic Storm.
- 1800 UTC, (2330 IST) — The IMD reports that Severe Cyclonic Storm Gonu (02A), has intensified into a Very Severe Cyclonic Storm.
- 1800 UTC, (2330 IST) — The IMD reports that Very Severe Cyclonic Storm Gonu (02A), has become the most intense Cyclonic Storm on record in the Arabian sea.

June 4

- 1500 UTC, (2030 IST) — The IMD reports that Severe Cyclonic Storm Gonu (02A), has intensified into a Super Cyclonic Storm.
- 1500 UTC, (2030 IST) — The IMD reports that Super Cyclonic Storm Gonu (02A), has reached its 3-minute peak sustained wind speeds of 240 km/h, (150 mph).
- 2100 UTC, (0230 IST, June 6) — The IMD reports that Super Cyclonic Storm Gonu (02A), has weakened into a Very Severe Cyclonic Storm.

June 6

- 0300 UTC, (0830 IST) — The IMD reports that Very Severe Cyclonic Storm Gonu (02A), has made landfall on Oman.
- 2100 UTC, (0230 IST, June 7) — The IMD reports that Very Severe Cyclonic Storm Gonu (02A), has weakened into a Severe Cyclonic Storm.

June 7

- 0000 UTC, (0530 IST) — The IMD reports that Severe Cyclonic Storm Gonu (02A), has weakened into a cyclonic storm.
- 0400 UTC, (0930 IST) — The IMD reports that Cyclonic Storm Gonu (02A), has made landfall near Makaran in Iran.
- 0600 UTC, (1130 IST) — The IMD issues its final advisory on Cyclonic Storm Gonu (02A).

June 21

- 0000 UTC, (0530 IST) — The JTWC reports that Tropical Depression 03B, has formed about 375 km, (235 mi), to the southeast of Visakhapatnam in India.
- 0300 UTC, (0830 IST) — The IMD designates Tropical Depression 03B as Depression BOB 03.
- 1200 UTC, (0530 IST) — The IMD reports that Depression BOB 03 has intensified into a deep depression.

June 22

- c. 2300 UTC — Deep Depression BOB 03/2007 makes landfall near Kakinada, Andhra Pradesh, India.

- 0900 UTC — The JTWC issues its final advisory on Tropical Cyclone 03B, dissipating in the Deccan Plateau in India.

June 23
- 0300 UTC — Deep Depression BOB 03/2007 is downgraded to a depression.

June 24
- 0300 UTC — The IMD issues its final bulletin on Depression BOB 03/2007.

June 25
- 0300 UTC — The IMD resumes advisories on Depression BOB 03/2007.
- 0900 UTC — The JTWC resumes advisories on Tropical Cyclone 03B, south of Karachi, Pakistan.
- 1200 UTC — Depression BOB 03/2007 is upgraded to Deep Depression BOB 03/2007.
- 1300 UTC — The PMD upgrades Deep Depression BOB 03/2007 to a severe cyclonic storm, naming it "Yemyin". However, the IMD does not follow suit at this time, leaving this storm operationally unnamed. It would be retroactively named Yemyin in post-analysis.

June 26
- c. 0300 UTC — Deep Depression BOB 03/2007 makes landfall near Ormara and Pasni, in Balochistan province, Pakistan, and its final bulletin was issued.
- 2100 UTC — The JTWC issues its final advisory on Tropical Cyclone 03B, dissipating in inland Pakistan.

June 27

- 0000 UTC, (0530 IST) — The JTWC reports that Tropical Depression 04B has formed about 410 km (255 mi) to the southeast of Puri, India.

June 28

- 0000 UTC, (0530 IST) — The IMD designates Tropical Depression 04B as Depression BOB 04.
- 0300 UTC, (0830 IST) — The IMD reports that Depression BOB 04, has intensified into a deep depression.
- 1200 UTC, (1730 IST) — The JTWC reports that Tropical Depression BOB 04 (04B), has intensified into a tropical storm.

June 29

- 0100 UTC, (0630 IST) — The IMD reports that Deep Depression BOB 04 (04B), has made landfall near Puri, India.
- 1800 UTC, (2330 IST) — The JTWC reports that Tropical Storm BOB 04 (04B), has weakened into a tropical depression.

June 30

- 0000 UTC, (0530 IST) — The JTWC reports that Tropical Depression BOB 04 (04B), has weakened into a tropical disturbance.
- 0300 UTC, (0830 IST) — The IMD reports that Deep Depression BOB 04 (04B), has weakened into a depression.
- 0600 UTC, (1130 IST) — The JTWC issues its final advisory on Tropical Disturbance BOB 04 (04B).

=== July ===
July 1

- 1200 UTC, (1730 IST) — The IMD issues its final advisory on Depression BOB 04 as it weakens into an area of low pressure.

July 4

- 0300 UTC, (0830 IST) — The IMD reports that Depression BOB 05 has formed over Bangladesh about 135 km, (85 mi), to the southeast of Kolkata, India.

July 5

- 1200 UTC, (1730 IST) — The IMD reports that Depression BOB 05, has intensified into a deep depression.

July 7

- 0300 UTC, (0830 IST) — The IMD reports that Deep Depression BOB 05, has weakened into a depression.

July 9

- 1200 UTC, (1730 IST) — The IMD issues its final advisory on Depression BOB 05, as it weakens into a low-pressure area.

=== August ===
August 5

- 0000 UTC, (0530 IST) — The IMD reports that Depression BOB 06 has formed about 285 km, (210 mi), to the south of Kolkata, India.
- 1800 UTC, (2330 IST) — The IMD reports that Depression BOB 06 has intensified into a deep depression.

August 6

- 0200 UTC, (0730 IST) — The IMD reports that Deep Depression BOB 06 has made landfall between Chandbali and Paradip.

August 7

- 0300 UTC, (0830 IST) — The IMD reports that Deep Depression BOB 06 has weakened into a depression.
- 1200 UTC, (1730 IST) — The IMD issues its final advisory on Depression BOB 06 as it weakens into a low-pressure area.

=== September ===
September 21

- 1200 UTC, (1730 IST) — The IMD reports that Depression BOB 07 has formed about 335 km, (210 mi), to the east of Visakhapatnam, India.

September 22

- 1400 UTC, (1930 IST) — The IMD reports that Depression BOB 07 has made landfall near Puri in Orissa, India.

September 24

- 1200 UTC, (1730 IST) — The IMD issues its final advisory on Depression BOB 07 as it weakens into a low-pressure area.

=== October ===
October 27

- 0600 UTC, (1130 IST) — The JTWC reports that a Tropical Depression 05A has formed about 1160 km, (620 mi), to the southeast of Mumbai in India.
- 1800 UTC, (2330 IST) — The IMD reports that Depression BOB 08 has formed about 725 km, (450 mi), to the southeast of Visakhapatnam in India.
- 1800 UTC, (2330 IST) — The IMD designates Tropical Depression 05A as Depression ARB 03.

October 28

- 0000 UTC, (0530 IST) — The JTWC reports that Tropical Depression ARB 03 (05A), has intensified into a tropical storm.
- 0000 UTC, (0530 IST) — The JTWC reports that Tropical Storm ARB 03 (05A), has reached its 1-minute peak sustained wind speeds of 75 km/h, (45 mph).
- 0300 UTC, (0830 IST) — The IMD reports that Depression ARB 03 (05A), has intensified into a deep depression.
- 0300 UTC, (0830 IST) — The IMD reports that Tropical Storm ARB 03 (05A), has reached its 3-minute peak sustained wind speeds of 55 km/h, (35 mph).

October 29

- 0300 UTC, (0830 IST) — The IMD issues their final advisory on Depression BOB 08 as it weakens into a low-pressure area.

October 30

- 0000 UTC, (0530 IST) — The JTWC reports that Tropical Storm ARB 03 (05A), has weakened into a tropical depression.
- 0000 UTC, (0530 IST) — The JTWC issues their final advisory on Tropical Depression ARB 03 (05A).

=== November ===
November 2

- 0300 UTC, (0830 IST) — The IMD reports that Deep Depression ARB 03 (05A), has weakened into a depression.
- 1200 UTC, (1730 IST) — The IMD reports that Depression ARB 03 (05A), has weakened into a low-pressure area and issues its final advisory.

November 10

- 1800 UTC, (2330 IST) — The JTWC reports that Tropical Depression 06B, has formed about 200 km, (125 mi), to the south of Port Blair in the Andaman islands.

November 11

- 0600 UTC, (1130 IST) — The JTWC reports that Tropical Depression 06B has intensified into a tropical storm.
- 0900 UTC, (1430 IST) — RSMC New Delhi designates Tropical Depression 06B as Depression BOB 09.
- 1800 UTC, (2330 IST) — The IMD reports that Depression BOB 09 (06B), has intensified into a deep depression.

November 12

- 0300 UTC, (0830 IST) — The IMD reports that Deep Depression BOB 09 (06B), has intensified into a cyclonic storm and names it as Sidr.
- 0600 UTC, (1130 IST) — The JTWC reports that Tropical Storm Sidr (06B), has intensified into a category 1 tropical cyclone.
- 1200 UTC, (1730 IST) — The IMD reports that Cyclonic Storm Sidr has intensified into a severe cyclonic storm.
- 1800 UTC, (2330 IST) — The IMD reports that Severe Cyclonic Storm Sidr has intensified into a very severe cyclonic storm.
- 1800 UTC, (2330 IST) — The JTWC reports that Tropical Cyclone Sidr (06B), has intensified into a category 3 tropical cyclone.

November 13

- 0600 UTC, (1130 IST) — The JTWC reports that Tropical Cyclone Sidr (06B), has intensified into a category 4 tropical cyclone.

November 14

- 1200 UTC, (1730 IST) — The JTWC reports that Tropical Cyclone Sidr (06B), has intensified into a category 4 super tropical cyclone.
- 1800 UTC, (2330 IST) — The JTWC reports that Super Tropical Cyclone Sidr (06B), has intensified into a category 5 super tropical cyclone.
- 1800 UTC, (2330 IST) — The JTWC reports that Super Tropical Cyclone Sidr (06B), has reached its 1-minute peak sustained wind speeds of 260 km/h, (160 mph).

November 15

- 0300 UTC, (0830 IST) — The IMD reports that Very Severe Cyclonic Storm Sidr has reached its 3-minute peak sustained wind speeds of 215 km/h, (130 mph).
- 1200 UTC, (1730 IST) — The JTWC reports that Super Tropical Cyclone Sidr (06B), has weakened into a category 4 super tropical cyclone.
- 1600 UTC, (1930 IST) — Very Severe Cyclonic Storm Sidr makes landfall on Bangladesh.
- 1800 UTC, (2330 IST) — The JTWC reports that Super Tropical Cyclone Sidr (06B), has rapidly weakened into a category 3 tropical cyclone.
- 2100 UTC, (0230 IST, November 16) — The IMD reports that Very Severe Cyclonic Storm Sidr has weakened into a cyclonic storm.

November 16

- 0000 UTC, (0530 IST) — The JTWC reports that Super Tropical Cyclone Sidr (06B), has rapidly weakened into a tropical storm.
- 0000 UTC, (0530 IST) — The JTWC issues its final advisory on Tropical Storm Sidr (06B) as it rapidly dissipates.
- 0300 UTC, (0830 IST) — The IMD reports that Cyclonic Storm Sidr has weakened into a depression and issues its final advisory as it rapidly dissipates.

=== December ===
- There were no Cyclonic Disturbances reported in the North Indian Ocean during December 2007.

== See also ==
- North Indian Ocean tropical cyclone
- Timeline of the 2007 Atlantic hurricane season
- Timeline of the 2007 Pacific hurricane season
- Timeline of the 2007 Pacific typhoon season
- South-West Indian Ocean cyclone seasons: 2007–08
- Australian region cyclone seasons: 2007–08
- South Pacific cyclone seasons: 2007–08
