= Cyclone Ivan =

Intense Tropical Cyclone Ivan
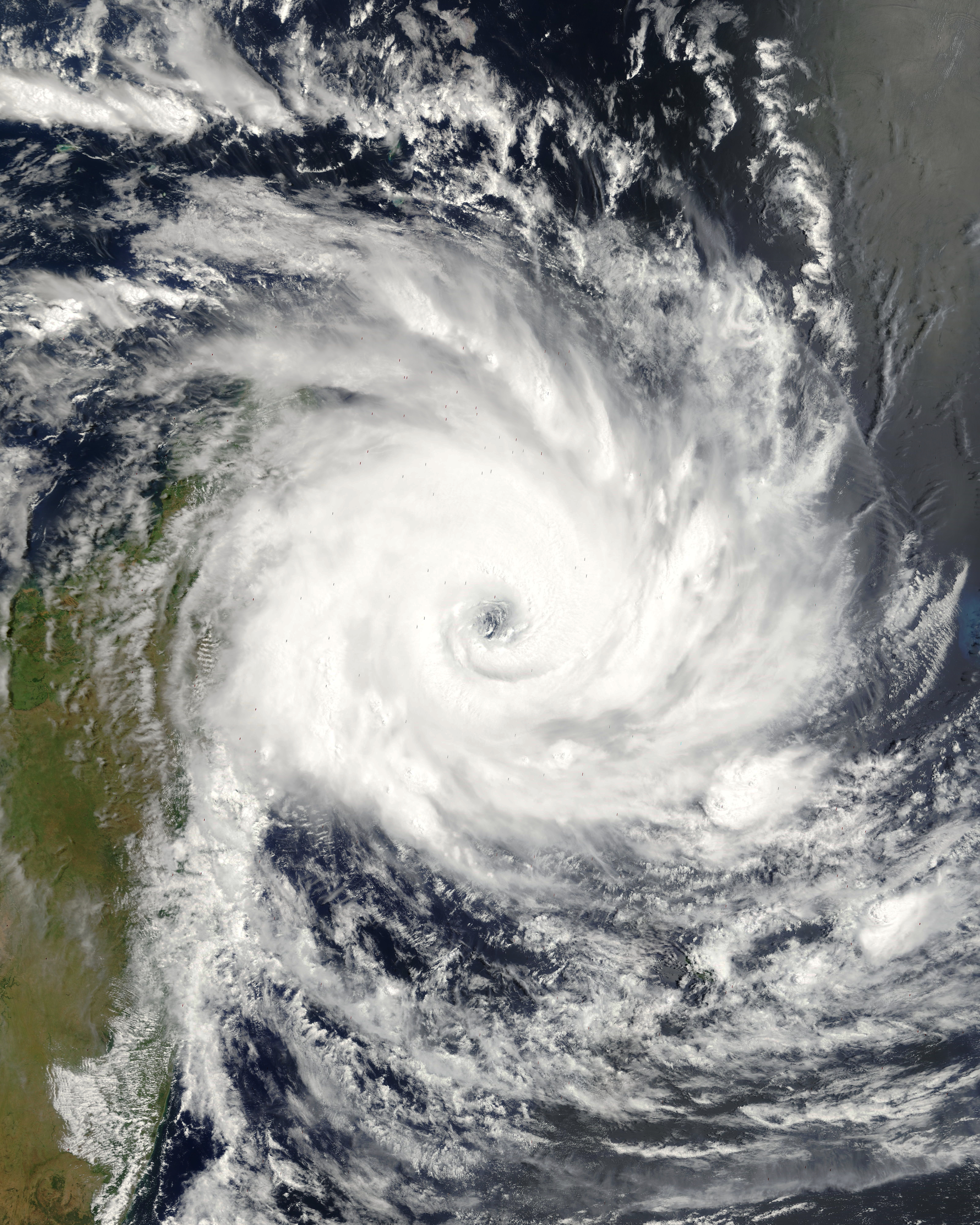
- Intense Tropical Cyclone Ivan near peak strength on 16 February

Meteorological history
- Formed: 7 February 2008
- Dissipated: 22 February 2008

Intense tropical cyclone
- 10-minute sustained (MFR)
- Highest winds: 185 km/h (115 mph)
- Highest gusts: 260 km/h (160 mph)
- Lowest pressure: 930 hPa (mbar); 27.46 inHg

Category 4-equivalent tropical cyclone
- 1-minute sustained (SSHWS/JTWC)
- Highest winds: 230 km/h (145 mph)
- Lowest pressure: 929 hPa (mbar); 27.43 inHg

Overall effects
- Fatalities: 93 direct, 176 missing
- Damage: $30 million (2008 USD)
- Areas affected: Madagascar
- IBTrACS
- Part of the 2007–08 South-West Indian Ocean cyclone season

Intense Tropical Cyclone Ivan was a powerful tropical cyclone that struck Madagascar in February 2008. Forming from a persistent area of convection on 7 February, Ivan initially tracked southeastward, before looping to the west-southwest. Encountering favourable conditions, it strengthened to attain peak winds on 17 February before striking northeastern Madagascar. It degenerated into a remnant low pressure area as it crossed the island, and briefly re-organized into a weak tropical depression before dissipating on 22 February.

Ivan caused heavy damage in Madagascar, leaving severe flooding and wind damage. In Île Sainte-Marie, the worst hit area, 90% of the infrastructure was destroyed, and 70% of the structures were destroyed. On mainland Madagascar, over 400,000 acres (1,600 km^{2}) of cultivated crops were destroyed, leaving hundreds of families without food. In addition, severe flooding and high winds in Toamasina left the entire city without electricity or drinkable water. In all, over 330,000 people were left homeless, and the storm caused 93 deaths.

== Meteorological history ==
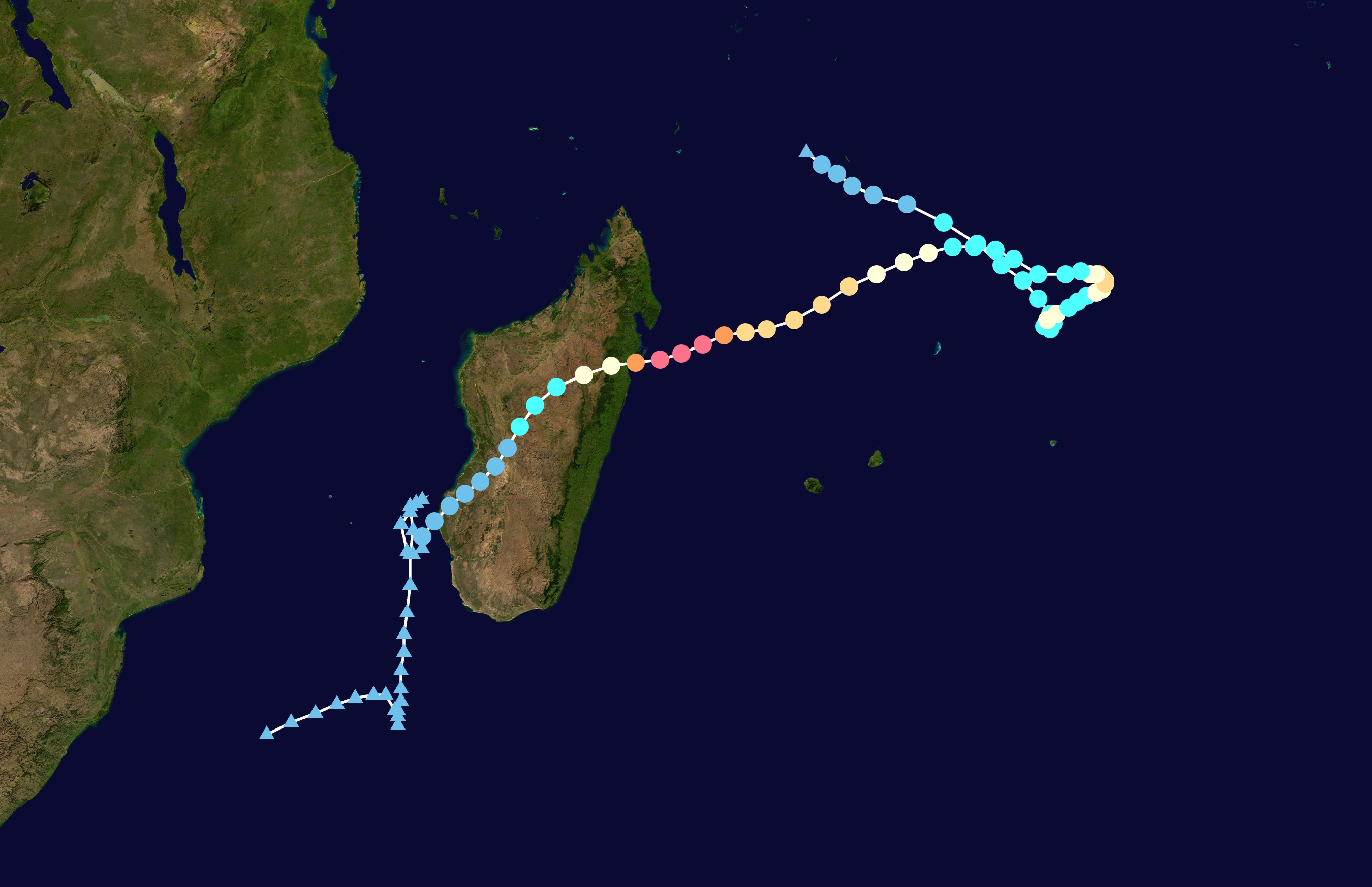
Map plotting the storm's track and intensity, according to the Saffir–Simpson scale Map key Saffir–Simpson scale Tropical depression (≤38 mph, ≤62 km/h) Tropical storm (39–73 mph, 63–118 km/h) Category 1 (74–95 mph, 119–153 km/h) Category 2 (96–110 mph, 154–177 km/h) Category 3 (111–129 mph, 178–208 km/h) Category 4 (130–156 mph, 209–251 km/h) Category 5 (≥157 mph, ≥252 km/h) Unknown Storm type Tropical cyclone Subtropical cyclone Extratropical cyclone, remnant low, tropical disturbance, or monsoon depression

On 5 February, an area of convection persisted about 555 km (900 mi) north of Réunion in the southwest Indian Ocean. The system maintained a broad low-level circulation with associated deep convection, and it slowly developed banding features. By early on 7 February, the circulation had become better defined as it remained in an area of weak wind shear and strong diffluence. At 06:00 UTC, Météo-France (MFR) classified it as Tropical Depression Eleven about 880 km (550 mi) north-northeast of Mauritius. Around the same time, the Joint Typhoon Warning Center (JTWC) began issuing advisories on the system as Tropical Cyclone 18S. The depression tracked east-southeastward, under the influence of a mid-level ridge. A cutoff low to the south of the system enhanced upper-level conditions, and it quickly strengthened into Tropical Storm Ivan.

The storm rapidly organized and developed an eye feature. Its intensification rate slowed as an upper-level trough began restricting outflow, and the motion of Ivan became nearly stationary as it entered an area of weak steering currents. With its overall environment remaining favourable, the JTWC upgraded Ivan to tropical cyclone status – winds greater than 119 km/h (74 mph) – early on 9 February. However, the MFR retained Ivan as a strong tropical storm. Late on 9 February, the storm temporarily weakened when wind shear increased, though the next day it re-intensified as convection increased; a banding eye formed in the center of the convection, prompting the JTWC to re-upgrade Ivan to tropical cyclone status late on 10 February. On 11 February, the MFR upgraded Ivan to tropical cyclone status 1025 km (640 mi) northeast of Mauritius.

By 14 February, it had sped up and entered a more favourable environment, becoming a severe tropical storm. On 15 February, Ivan was re-upgraded to a tropical cyclone as favourable conditions persisted. Ivan was further upgraded to an Intense Tropical Cyclone on 16 February as it moved closer to Madagascar. Ivan made landfall north of Fanoarivo, Madagascar on 17 February. Once overland, rapid weakening occurred due to the rugged terrain of the island. Ivan was forecast to regenerate over the Mozambique Channel into a tropical depression once it left Madagascar. Ivan traversed Madagascar, heading southwest. Its remnants emerged back over water on 21 February, and Météo-France resumed advisories on "filling depression Ex-Ivan". Ivan, severely disrupted by Madagascar, did not strengthen any further; the last advisory was issued on 22 February.

== Impact ==
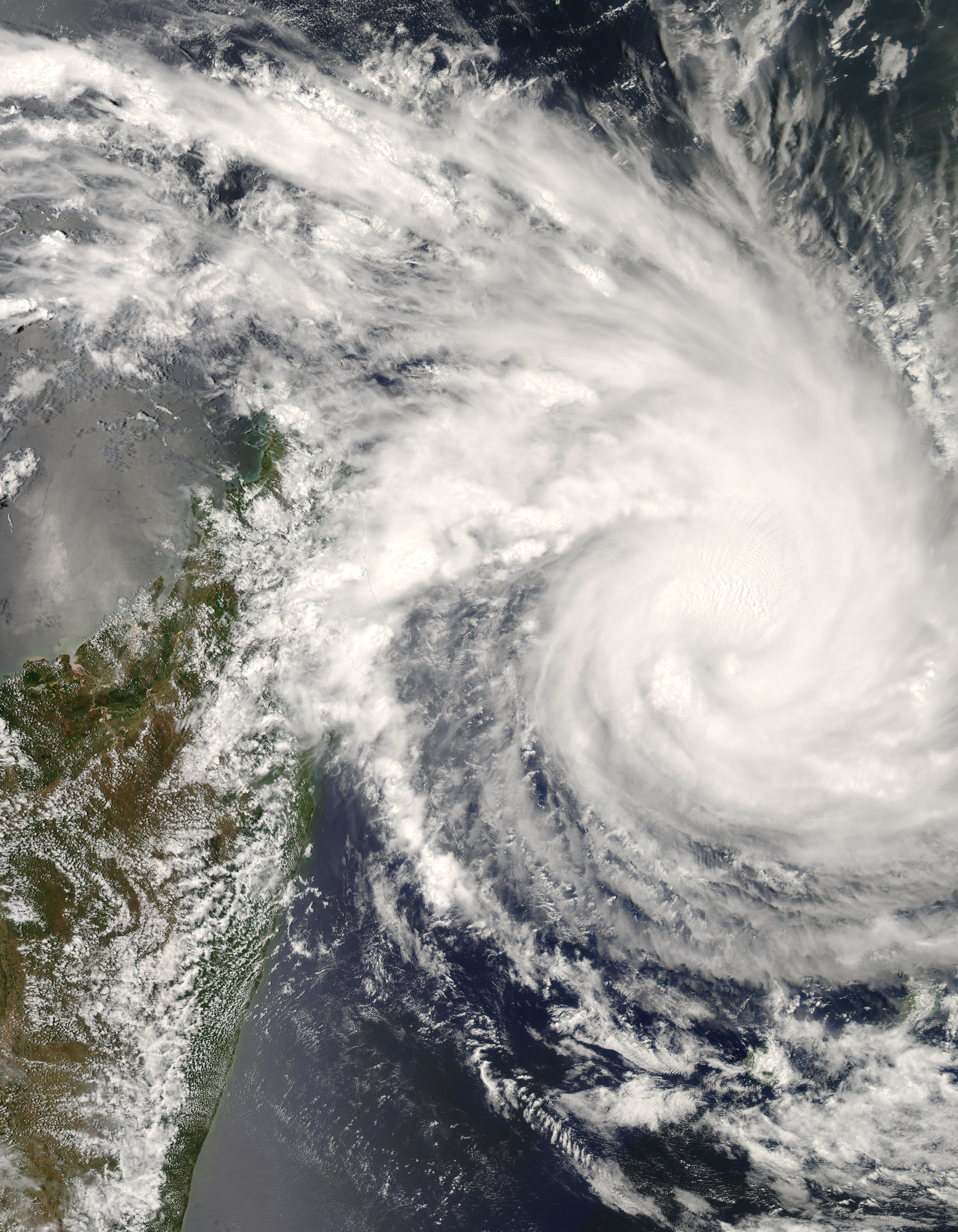
Cyclone Ivan intensifying on 15 February

Cyclone Ivan moved ashore on Madagascar near the city of Toamasina on 17 February, producing winds of 125 mph (200 km/h). According to local news agencies, Sainte Marie island off the coast of Madagascar was the highest affected area, with 9 people killed and 90% of the island's infrastructure destroyed, including a hotel which collapsed. On the island, all flights were suspended or canceled during the storm, and most areas were left without electric power. Also, 75 percent of the structures on the island were completely destroyed.

On mainland Madagascar, 100,000 acres (400 km^{2}) of rice crops were destroyed, and 300,000 acres (1,200 km^{2}) of other cultivated crops were destroyed. Because of this, many families had little or no food to eat. In Analanjirofo, the worst hit region on the mainland Madagascar, 80,000 people were left homeless, and most of the schools, houses and other structures were lost as a result of the flooding and high wind. Another major aspect of the damage there was the Antaratasy bridge, a connector between the region of Atsinanana and cities to the north, which was completely destroyed, isolating several people from their families. Its collapse, in addition to the extensive damage to communications, made it difficult or impossible to contact people who may have been affected by Ivan.

In the city of Toamasina, all water and electricity were cut off as a result of the storm. High winds downed trees and power lines, and rising flood waters were the focus of concern. In the region of Alaotra Mangoro Region, almost 23,000 people were in need of assistance, and flooding caused extensive damage. In the Analamanga Region, 18,000 people were reported to be left without shelter, and in the Atsinanana Region, up to 13,000 people were left homeless. In total, 190,000 people were homeless as a result of the cyclone and a total of 93 fatalities occurred.

== Aftermath ==
Following the cyclone, the U.S. Agency for International Development airlifted relief commodities and supplies to Madagascar. The U.S. Agency for International Development also provided 320 rolls of plastic sheeting valued at $213,100 (2008 USD), which provided shelter assistance to 3,000 affected families, and they provided an additional $100,000 (2008 USD) to CARE and the U.N. World Food Program to re-establish ground access to affected areas, and deliver emergency supplies and food aid. This brought the total U.S. Government's assistance to Madagascar following the cyclone to more than $300,000.

Almost 140 volunteers were provided by Malagasy Red Cross in seven districts in the eastern part of the country to help in relief aid. The Malagasy Red Cross received extra supplies from the French Red Cross which mobilized its intervention platform in the Indian Ocean to provide logistical support. Twelve tonnes of material was provided from the main center on La Reunion Island, including tarpaulins, tool kits, generators, water tablets and other emergency supplies. Also, the Malagasy president made a donation of 8 millions of ariary to local branches of the Malagasy Red Cross along with 20 tonnes of rice. As a result of this, the Red Cross was able to distribute emergency items to 1,207 families; each family received 16 kilograms (35 pounds) of rice, 500 grams (17 ounces) of salt, 1.5 litres (50 fluid ounces) of oil, two bars of soap, candles and a lighter.

== See also ==
- Geography of Madagascar
- Timeline of the 2007–08 South-West Indian Ocean cyclone season
- Tropical cyclones in 2008
- Cyclone Indlala (2007)
- Cyclone Bingiza (2011)
- Cyclone Giovanna (2012)
