= Timeline of the 2008 North Indian Ocean cyclone season =

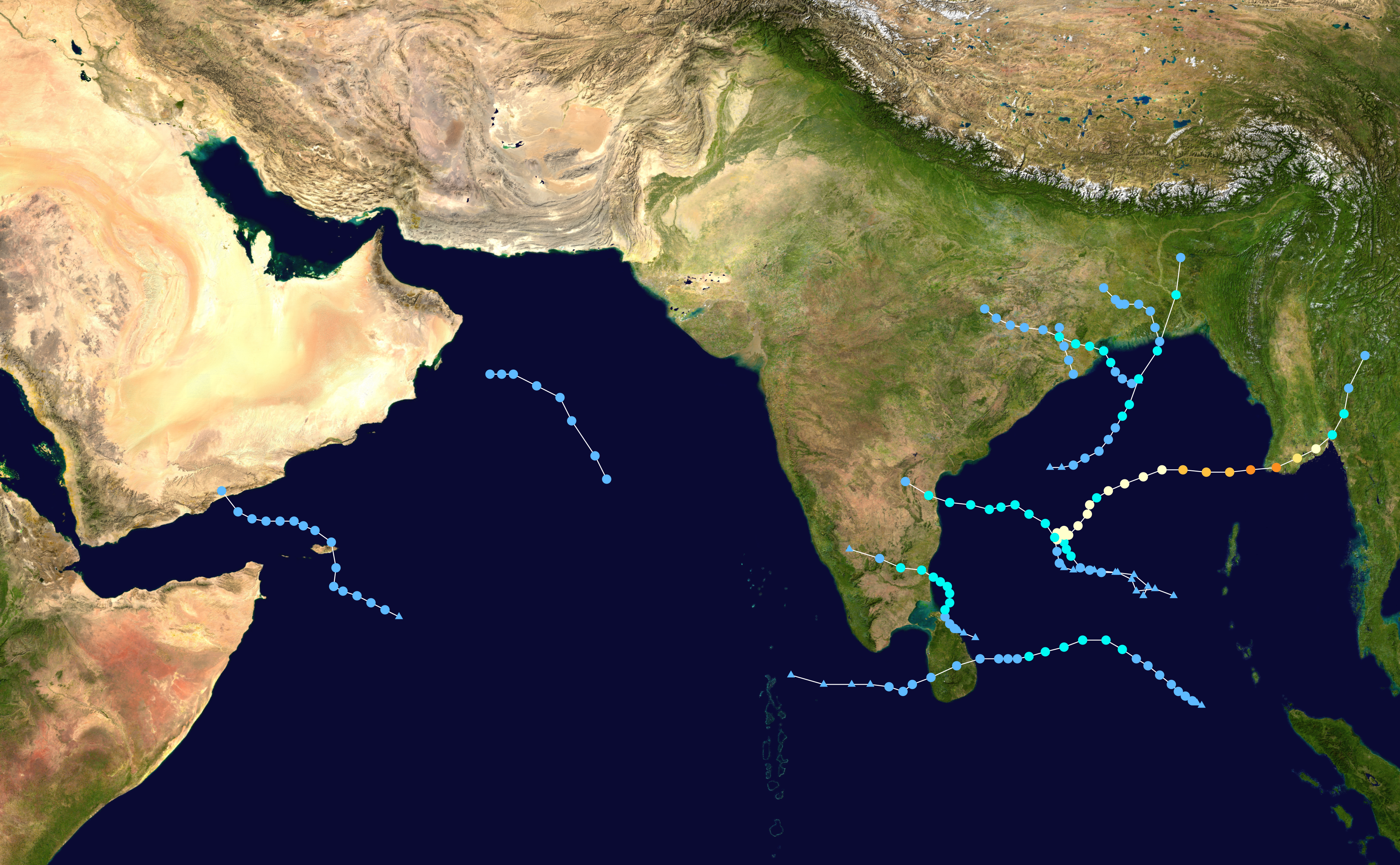
- Season summary map

Season boundaries
- First system formed: April 27, 2008
- Last system dissipated: December 8, 2008

Strongest system
- Name: Nargis
- Maximum winds: 165 km/h (105 mph) (3-minute sustained)
- Lowest pressure: 962 hPa (mbar)

Longest lasting system
- Name: Nargis
- Duration: 7 days
Storm articles

The 2008 North Indian Ocean cyclone season officially ran throughout the year during 2008, with the first depression forming on April 27. The timeline includes information that was not operationally released, meaning that information from post-storm reviews by the Joint Typhoon Warning Center (JTWC), and the India Meteorological Department (IMD), such as information on a storm that was not operationally warned on. This timeline documents all the storm formations, strengthening, weakening, landfalls, extratropical transitions, as well as dissipation's during the 2008 North Indian Ocean cyclone season.

During the year, 10 tropical depressions, 4 Cyclonic storms and 1 Severe Cyclonic storm formed. The scope of this basin is north of the Equator and west of the Malaysian Peninsula. The India Meteorological Department (IMD) and Joint Typhoon Warning Center (JTWC) monitor tropical cyclones in this basin. This basin is divided into two different seas by the IMD; the Arabian Sea to the west of India, which is abbreviated as ARB by the IMD, and the Bay of Bengal to the east of India, which is abbreviated as BOB by the IMD.

== Timeline of storms ==
=== April ===
26 April
- 18:00 UTC (11:30 p.m. IST) – The Joint Typhoon Warning Center (JTWC) reports that Tropical Depression 01B has formed roughly 765 km (465 mi) (Note: The figures for maximum sustained winds and position estimates are rounded to the nearest 5 units (knots, miles, or kilometers), following the convention used in the Joint Typhoon Warning Center and India Meteorological Department's operational products for each storm. All other units are rounded to the nearest digit.) east of Chennai, Tamil Nadu.
27 April
- 03:00 UTC (8:30 a.m. IST) – The India Meteorological Department (IMD) designates Tropical Depression 01B as a depression.
- 12:00 UTC (5:30 p.m. IST) – The IMD reports that Depression BOB 01 (01B), has intensified into a deep depression.
- 12:00 UTC (5:30 p.m. IST) – The JTWC reports that Tropical Depression 01B has intensified into a tropical storm.
28 April
- 00:00 UTC (5:30 a.m. IST) – The IMD reports that Deep Depression BOB 01 (01B), has intensified into a cyclonic storm and names it "Nargis".
- 06:00 UTC (11:30 a.m. IST) – The JTWC reports that Tropical Storm Nargis (01B), has intensified into a category 1 tropical cyclone.
- 09:00 UTC (2:30 p.m. IST) – The IMD reports that Cyclonic Storm Nargis (01B), has intensified into a severe cyclonic storm.
29 April
- 03:00 UTC (8:30 a.m. IST) – The IMD reports that Severe Cyclonic Storm Nargis (01B), has intensified into a very severe cyclonic storm.
30 April
- 06:00 UTC (11:30 a.m. IST) – The JTWC reports that Tropical Cyclone Nargis (01B), has weakened into a tropical storm.
- 12:00 UTC (5:30 p.m. IST) – The JTWC reports that Tropical Storm Nargis (01B), has re-intensified into a category 1 tropical cyclone.

=== May ===
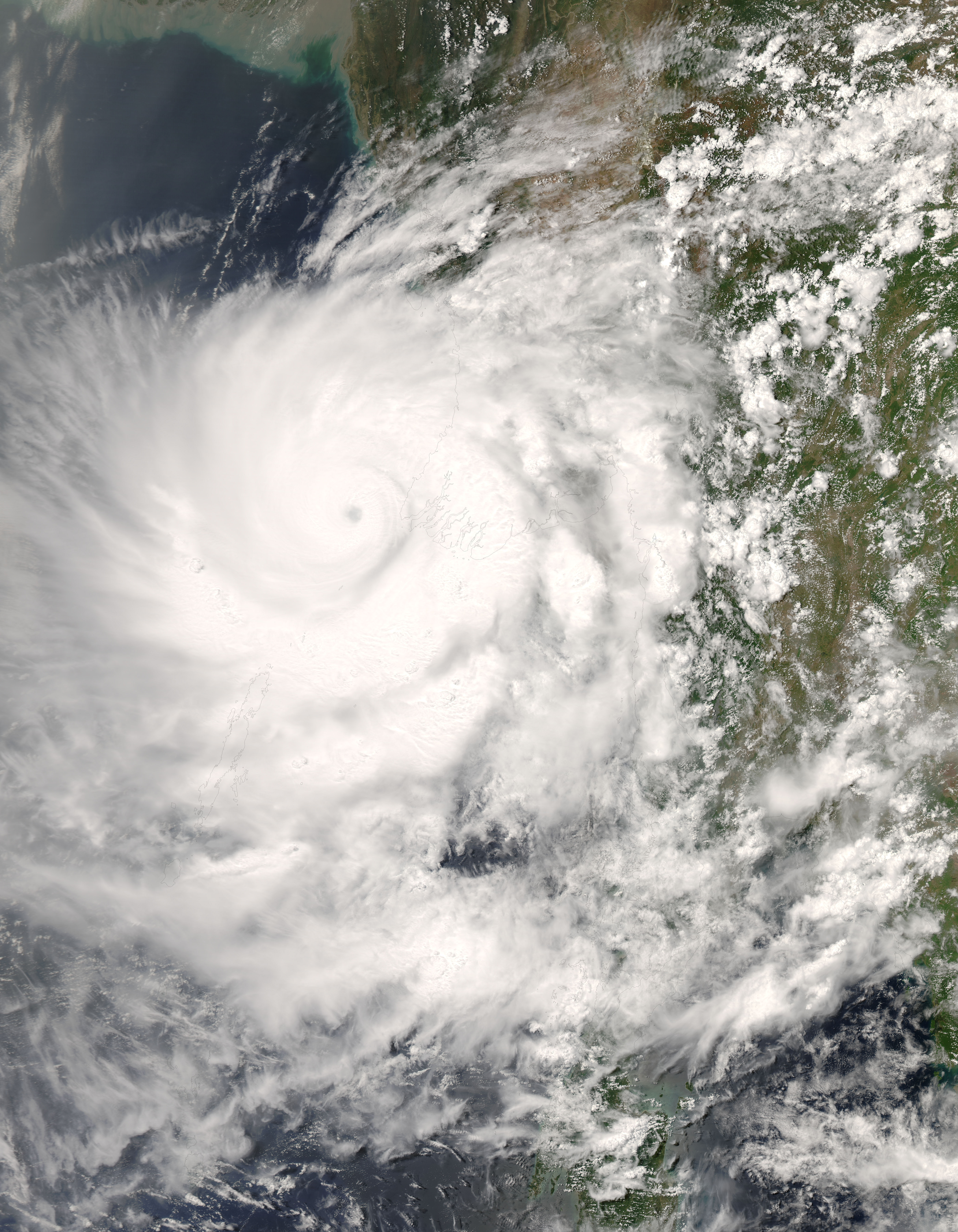
Extremely Severe Cyclonic Storm Nargis (01B) approaching landfall on 2 May

1 May
- 12:00 UTC (5:30 pm. IST) – The JTWC reports that Tropical Cyclone Nargis (01B), has intensified into a category 3 tropical cyclone.
2 May
- 03:00 UTC (8:30 a.m. IST) – The IMD reports that Very Severe Cyclonic Storm Nargis (01B), has intensified into an extremely severe cyclonic storm. Simultaneously they report that it has reached its peak intensity with 3-minute sustained wind speeds of 165 km/h (105 mph).
- 06:00 UTC (11:30 a.m. IST) – The JTWC reports that Tropical Cyclone Nargis has intensified into a category 4 tropical cyclone. Simultaneously, they report that the storm has reached its peak 1-minute sustained wind speeds of 215 km/h (135 mph).
- 12:00 – 14:00 UTC (5:30 – 7:30 p.m. IST) – Extremely Severe Cyclonic Storm Nargis (01B), makes landfall on the southwestern coast of Myanmar at peak intensity with 3-minute sustained wind speeds of 165 km/h (105 mph).
- 18:00 UTC (11:30 p.m. IST) – The IMD reports that Extremely Severe Cyclonic Storm Nargis (01B), has weakened into a very severe cyclonic storm.
- 18:00 UTC (11:30 p.m. IST) – The JTWC reports that Tropical Cyclone Nargis (01B), has weakened into a category 2 tropical cyclone.
- 21:00 UTC (2:30 a.m. IST, 3 May) – The IMD reports that Very Severe Cyclonic Storm Nargis (01B), has weakened into a severe cyclonic storm.
3 May
- 00:00 UTC (5:30 a.m. IST) – The JTWC reports that Tropical Cyclone Nargis (01B), has weakened into a category 1 tropical cyclone.
- 06:00 UTC (11:30 a.m. IST) – The IMD reports that Severe Cyclonic Storm Nargis (01B), has weakened into a cyclonic storm.
- 06:00 UTC (11:30 a.m. IST) – The JTWC reports that Tropical Cyclone Nargis (01B), has weakened into a tropical storm.
- 12:00 UTC (5:30 p.m. IST) – The IMD reports that Cyclonic Storm Nargis (01B), has degenerated into an area of low pressure while located over eastern Myanmar.
- 18:00 UTC (11:30 p.m. IST) – The JTWC reports that Tropical Storm Nargis (01B), has weakened into a tropical depression.
4 May
- 00:00 UTC (5:30 a.m. IST) – The JTWC reports that Tropical Depression Nargis (01B), has dissipated while located over eastern Myanmar.

=== June ===
5 June
- 00:00 UTC (5:30 a.m. IST) – The IMD reports that Depression ARB 01 has formed roughly 830 km (530 mi) southwest of Mumbai, India. Simultaneously, they report that the system has reached its peak 3-minute sustained wind speeds of 45 km/h (30 mph).
7 June
- 00:00 UTC (5:30 a.m. IST) – The IMD reports that Depression ARB 01 has weakened into an area of low pressure while located roughly 480 km (300 mi) southeast of Muscat, Oman.
16 June
- 03:00 UTC (8:30 a.m. IST) – The IMD reports that Depression BOB 02 has formed roughly 220 km (135 mi) southeast of Kolkata, India. Simultaneously, they report that the system has reached its peak 3-minute sustained wind speeds of 45 km/h (30 mph).
- 11:00 – 12:00 UTC (4:30 – 5:30 p.m. IST) – Depression BOB 02 makes landfall on the coast of Bangladesh at peak intensity with 3-minute sustained wind speeds of 45 km/h (30 mph).
18 June
- 09:00 UTC (2:30 p.m. IST) – The IMD reports that Depression BOB 02 has weakened into an area of low pressure while located over Jharkhand.

=== August ===
9 August
- 12:00 UTC (5:30 p.m. IST) – The IMD reports that Land Depression BOB 03 has formed over Odisha. Simultaneously, they report that the system has reached its peak 3-minute sustained wind speeds of 45 km/h (30 mph).
10 August
- 12:00 UTC (5:30 p.m. IST) – The IMD reports that Land Depression BOB 03 has weakened into an area of low pressure over northern Odisha.

=== September ===
15 September
- 12:00 UTC (5:30 p.m. IST) – The IMD reports that Depression BOB 04 has formed roughly 345 km (215 mi) south of Kolkata, India.
- 12:00 UTC (5:30 p.m. IST) – The JTWC designates Depression BOB 04 as Tropical Depression 02B.
16 September
- 06:00 UTC (11:30 a.m. IST) – The IMD reports that Depression BOB 04 (02B), has intensified into a deep depression. Simultaneously, they report that the system has reached its peak 3-minute sustained wind speeds of 55 km/h (35 mph).
- 06:00 UTC (11:30 a.m. IST) – The JTWC reports that Tropical Depression 02B has intensified into a tropical storm.
- 16:00 – 17:00 UTC (9:30 – 10:30 p.m. IST) – Deep Depression BOB 04 (02B), makes landfall near Chandbali, Odisha at peak intensity with 3-minute sustained wind speeds of 55 km/h (35 mph).
- 18:00 UTC (11:30 p.m. IST) – The JTWC reports that Tropical Storm 02B has reached its peak 1-minute sustained wind speeds of 80 km/h (50 mph).
17 September
- 12:00 UTC (5:30 p.m. IST) – The JTWC reports that Tropical Storm 02B has weakened into a tropical depression.
18 September
- 09:00 UTC (2:30 p.m. IST) – The IMD reports that Deep Depression BOB 04 (02B), has weakened into a depression.
- 12:00 UTC (5:30 p.m. IST) – The JTWC reports that Tropical Depression 02B has dissipated while located over Chhattisgarh.
19 September
- 12:00 UTC (5:30 p.m. IST) – The IMD reports that Depression BOB 04 (02B), has weakened into an area of low pressure over central Uttar Pradesh.

=== October ===
19 October
- 09:00 UTC (2:30 p.m. IST) – The IMD reports that Depression ARB 02 has formed roughly 1,795 km (1,115 mi) northeast of Mogadishu, Somalia.
20 October
- 06:00 UTC (11:30 a.m. IST) – The JTWC designates Depression ARB 02 as Tropical Depression 03A.
- 18:00 UTC (11:30 p.m. IST) – The JTWC reports that Tropical Depression 03A has reached its peak 1-minute sustained wind speeds of 55 km/h (35 mph).
21 October
- 03:00 UTC (8:30 a.m. IST) – The IMD reports that Depression ARB 02 has intensified into a deep depression. Simultaneously, they report that the system has reached its peak 3-minute sustained wind speeds of 55 km/h (35 mph).
- 18:00 UTC (11:30 p.m. IST) – Deep Depression ARB 02 makes landfall on the Yemeni island of Socotra at peak intensity with 3-minute sustained wind speeds of 55 mph (35 mph).
22 October
- 03:00 UTC (8:30 a.m. IST) – The IMD reports that Deep Depression ARB 02 has weakened into a depression.
23 October
- 03:00 UTC (8:30 a.m. IST) – The IMD reports that Depression ARB 02 has weakened into an area of low pressure while located over the western Arabian Sea.
- 18:00 UTC (11:30 p.m. IST) – The JTWC reports that Tropical Depression 03A has dissipated while located over the western Arabian Sea.
24 October
- 18:00 UTC (11:30 p.m. IST) – The JTWC reports that Tropical Depression 04B has formed roughly 370 km (230 mi) southeast of Visakhapatnam, India.
25 October
- 03:00 UTC (8:30 a.m. IST) – The IMD designates Tropical Depression 04B as Depression BOB 05.
26 October
- 00:00 UTC (5:30 a.m. IST) – The IMD reports that Depression BOB 05 (04B), has intensified into a deep depression.
- 00:00 UTC (5:30 a.m. IST) – The JTWC reports that Tropical Depression 04B has intensified into a tropical storm.
- 12:00 UTC (5:30 p.m. IST) – The IMD reports that Deep Depression BOB 05 (04B), has intensified into a cyclonic storm and names it "Rashmi".
- 18:00 UTC (11:30 p.m. IST) – The JTWC reports that Tropical Storm Rashmi (04B), has reached its peak 1-minute sustained wind speeds of 80 km/h (50 mph).
- 21:00 UTC (2:30 a.m. IST, 27 October) – The IMD reports that Cyclonic Storm Rashmi (04B), has reached its peak 3-minute sustained wind speeds of 80 km/h (50 mph).
- 22:00 – 23:00 UTC (3:30 – 4:30 a.m. IST, 27 October) – Cyclonic Storm Rashmi (04B), makes landfall on the Bangladeshi coast at peak intensity with 3-minute sustained wind speeds of 80 km/h (50 mph).
27 October
- 03:00 UTC (8:30 a.m. IST) – The IMD reports that Cyclonic Storm Rashmi (04B), has weakened into a deep depression.
- 06:00 UTC (11:30 a.m. IST) – The JTWC reports that Tropical Storm Rashmi (04B), has weakened into a tropical depression and dissipated while located near the Bangladesh – Meghalaya border.
- 09:00 UTC (2:30 p.m. IST) – The IMD reports that the deep depression, ex-Rashmi (04B), has weakened into an area of low pressure over Meghalaya.

=== November ===
13 November
- 12:00 UTC (5:30 p.m. IST) – The IMD reports that Depression BOB 06 has formed roughly 595 km (370 mi) southeast of Chennai, India.
- 12:00 UTC (5:30 p.m. IST) – The JTWC designates Depression BOB 06 as Tropical Depression 05B.
14 November
- 00:00 UTC (5:30 a.m. IST) – The JTWC reports that Tropical Depression 05B has intensified into a tropical storm.
- 03:00 UTC (8:30 a.m. IST) – The IMD reports that Depression BOB 06 (05B), has intensified into a deep depression.
- 12:00 UTC (5:30 p.m. IST) – The IMD reports that Deep Depression BOB 06 (05B), has intensified into a cyclonic storm and names it Khai-Muk.
- 12:00 UTC (5:30 p.m. IST) – The JTWC reports that Tropical Storm Khai-Muk (05B), has reached its peak 1-minute sustained wind speeds of 70 km/h (45 mph).
- 21:00 UTC (2:30 a.m. IST, 15 November) – The IMD reports that Cyclonic Storm Khai-Muk (05B), has reached its peak 3-minute sustained wind speeds of 70 km/h (45 mph).
15 November
- 06:00 UTC (11:30 a.m. IST) – The IMD reports that Cyclonic Storm Khai-Muk (05B), has weakened into a deep depression.
- 22:00 – 2300 UTC (3:30 – 4:30 a.m. IST, 16 November) – The IMD reports that the deep depression, ex-Khai-Muk (05B), has made landfall near Kavali, Andhra Pradesh with winds of 55 km/h (35 mph).
16 November
- 03:00 UTC (8:30 a.m. IST) – The IMD reports that the deep depression, ex-Khai-Muk (05B), has weakened into a depression.
- 06:00 UTC (11:30 a.m. IST) – The JTWC reports that Tropical Storm Khai-Muk (05B), has weakened into a tropical depression and dissipated over southern Andhra Pradesh.
- 09:00 UTC (2:30 p.m. IST) – The IMD reports that the depression, ex-Khai-Muk (05B), has weakened into an area of low pressure over Rayalaseema and Telangana.
25 November
- 09:00 UTC (2:30 p.m. IST) – The IMD reports that Depression BOB 07 has formed over northern Sri Lanka.
- 12:00 UTC (5:30 p.m. IST) – The IMD reports that Depression BOB 07 has intensified into a deep depression.
26 November
- 03:00 UTC (8:30 a.m. IST) – The IMD reports that Deep Depression BOB 07 has intensified into a cyclonic storm and names it "Nisha".
- 09:00 UTC (2:30 p.m. IST) – The IMD reports that Cyclonic Storm Nisha has reached its peak 3-minute sustained wind speeds of 80 km/h (50 mph).
27 November
- 00:00 – 01:00 UTC (5:30 – 6:30 a.m. IST) – Cyclonic Storm Nisha makes landfall north of Karaikal, Puducherry at peak intensity with winds of 80 km/h (50 mph).
- 09:00 UTC (2:30 p.m. IST) – The IMD reports that Cyclonic Storm Nisha has weakened into a deep depression.
- 12:00 UTC (5:30 p.m. IST) – The IMD reports that the deep depression, ex-Nisha, has weakened into a depression.
28 November
- 00:00 UTC (5:30 a.m. IST) – The IMD reports that the depression, ex-Nisha, has weakened into an area of low pressure over northern Tamil Nadu.

=== December ===
4 December
- 03:00 UTC (8:30 a.m. IST) – The IMD reports that Depression BOB 08 has formed roughly 635 km (395 mi) northwest of Banda Aceh, Indonesia.
5 December
- 00:00 UTC (5:30 a.m. IST) – The IMD reports that Depression BOB 08 has intensified into a deep depression. Simultaneously, they report that the system has reached its peak 3-minute sustained wind speeds of 55 km/h (35 mph).
7 December
- 00:00 UTC (5:30 a.m. IST) – The IMD reports that Deep Depression BOB 08 has weakened into a depression.
- 15:00 UTC (8:30 p.m. IST) – The IMD reports that Depression BOB 08 has weakened into an area of low pressure over Sri Lanka.

== See also ==
- 2008 North Indian Ocean cyclone season
- North Indian Ocean tropical cyclone
