= Timeline of the 2007–08 South Pacific cyclone season =

Timeline of the 2007-08 South Pacific cyclone season
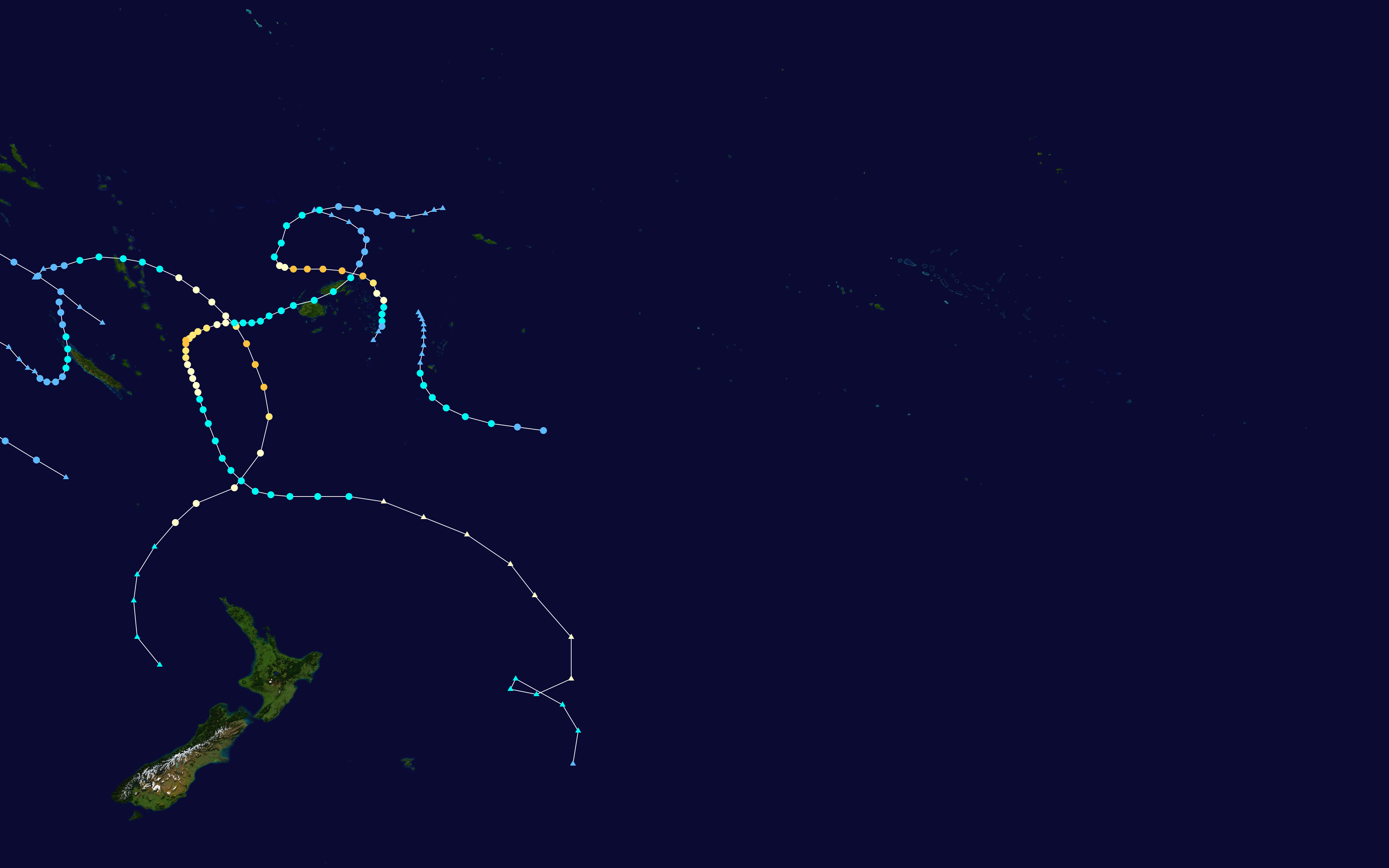
- Season summary map

Season boundaries
- First system formed: October 17, 2007
- Last system dissipated: April 19, 2008

Longest lasting system
- Name: Gene
- Duration: 10 days
Storm articles
- Cyclone Daman
- Cyclone Funa
- Cyclone Gene

The 2007–08 South Pacific cyclone season was a below-average season with only four tropical cyclones, forming within the South Pacific to the east of 160°E. (Note: An average season has nine tropical cyclones, about half of which become severe tropical cyclones.) The season officially ran from November 1, 2007, to April 30, 2008, although the first cyclone, Tropical Depression 01F, formed on October 17.

Within the South Pacific, tropical cyclones are monitored by the Regional Specialized Meteorological Center (RSMC) in Nadi, Fiji, and the Tropical Cyclone Warning Center (TCWC) in Wellington, New Zealand. RSMC Nadi attaches an F suffix to tropical disturbances that form in or move into the South Pacific. The United States' Joint Typhoon Warning Center (JTWC) issues unofficial warnings within the South Pacific, designating tropical cyclones with a number and a P suffix. RSMC Nadi and TCWC Wellington both use the Australian Tropical Cyclone Intensity Scale, and measure wind speeds over a period of ten minutes, while the JTWC measures sustained winds over a period of one minute and uses the Saffir–Simpson Hurricane Scale.

This timeline includes information from post-storm reviews by RSMC Nadi, TCWC Wellington and the JTWC. It documents tropical cyclone formations, strengthening, weakening, landfalls, extratropical transitions, and dissipations during the season. Reports among warning centers often differ; as such, information from all three agencies has been included.

== Timeline of storms ==
=== October ===
October 17
1800 UTC, (0600 FST, October 17) – RSMC Nadi reports that Tropical Disturbance 01F has formed about 880 km (545 mi) to the northwest of Port Vila, Vanuatu. (Note: UTC stands for Coordinated Universal Time.) (Note: FST stands for Fiji Standard Time, which is equivalent to UTC+12.) (Note: The figures for maximum sustained winds and position estimates are rounded to the nearest 5 units (knots, miles, or kilometers), following the convention used in the Fiji Meteorological Service's operational products for each storm. All other units are rounded to the nearest digit.)
2100 UTC, (0900 FST, October 17) – RSMC Nadi reports that Tropical Disturbance 01F has intensified into a tropical depression.

October 19
0900 UTC, (2100 FST) – RSMC Nadi issues the final advisory on Tropical Depression 01F.

=== November ===
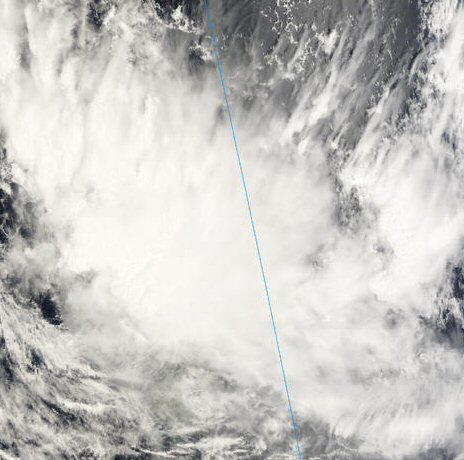
Tropical Depression 02F

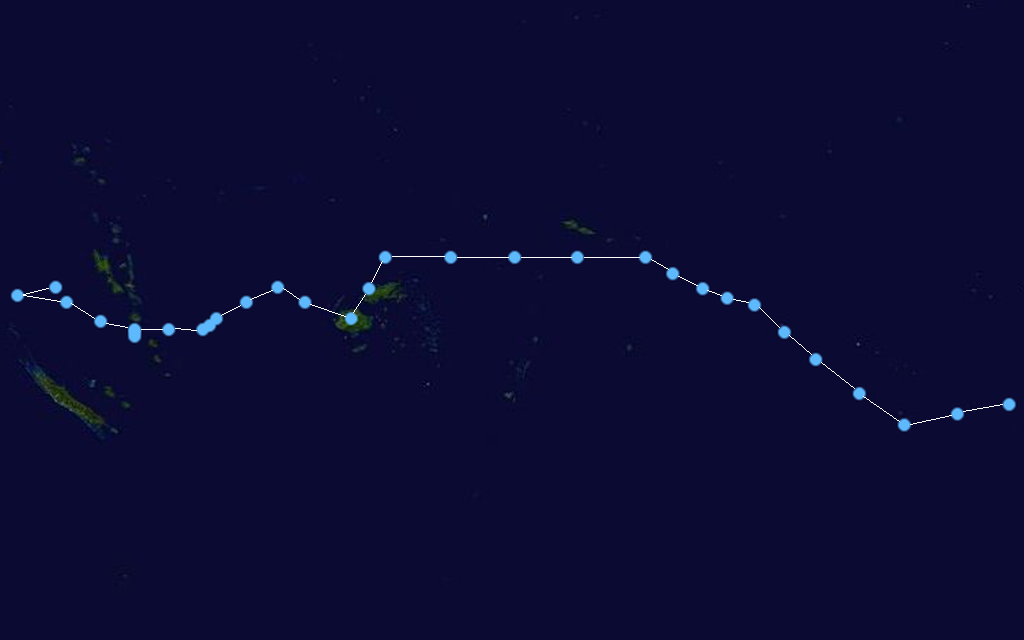
Track map of Tropical Depression 03F

November 1

- 0000 UTC, (1200 FST) – The 2007–08 South Pacific cyclone season officially begins.

November 20

- 1800 UTC, (0600 FST, November 21) – RSMC Nadi reports that Tropical Depression 02F has formed about 310 km (190 mi) to the northeast of Nadi, Fiji.

November 22

- 2100 UTC, (0900 FST, November 23) – RSMC Nadi issues the final advisory on Tropical Depression 02F, as it rapidly dissipates to the southeast of Fiji.

November 24

- 2100 UTC, (0900 FST, November 25) – RSMC Nadi reports that Tropical Disturbance 03F has formed about 390 km (240 mi) to the west of Port Vila, Vanuatu.

November 25

- 0600 UTC, (1800 FST) – RSMC Nadi reports that Tropical Disturbance 03F has intensified into a tropical depression.

November 27

- 2100 UTC, (0900 FST, November 28) – RSMC Nadi reports that Tropical Depression 03F has weakened into a tropical disturbance.

November 28

- 0000 UTC, (1200 FST) – RSMC Nadi reports that Tropical Disturbance 03F has re-intensified into a tropical depression.
- 2100 UTC, (0900 FST, November 29) – RSMC Nadi reports that Tropical Depression 03F has weakened into a tropical disturbance.

November 30

- 0900 UTC, (2100 FST) – RSMC Nadi reports that Tropical Disturbance 03F has re-intensified into a tropical depression.

=== December ===
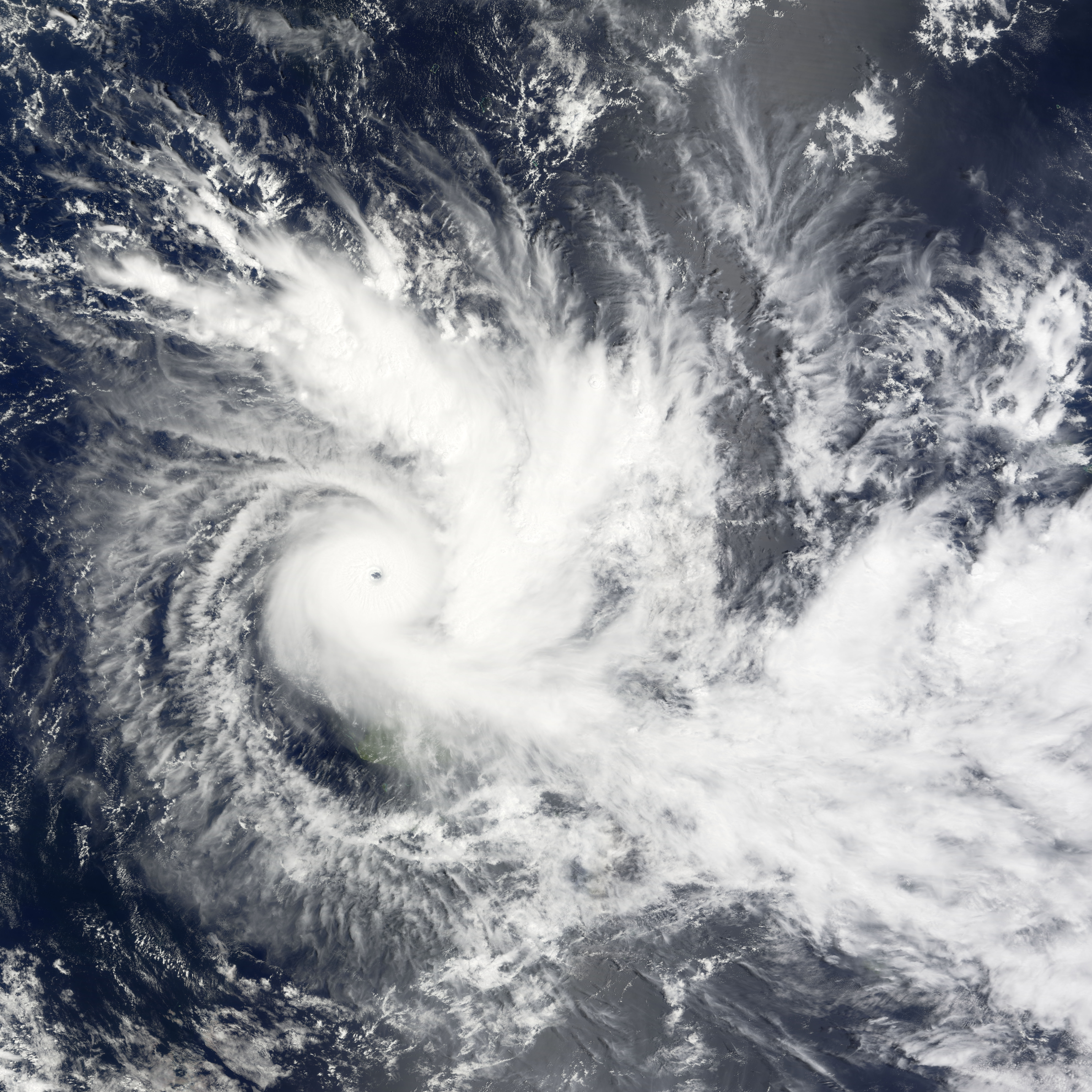
Severe Tropical Cyclone Daman

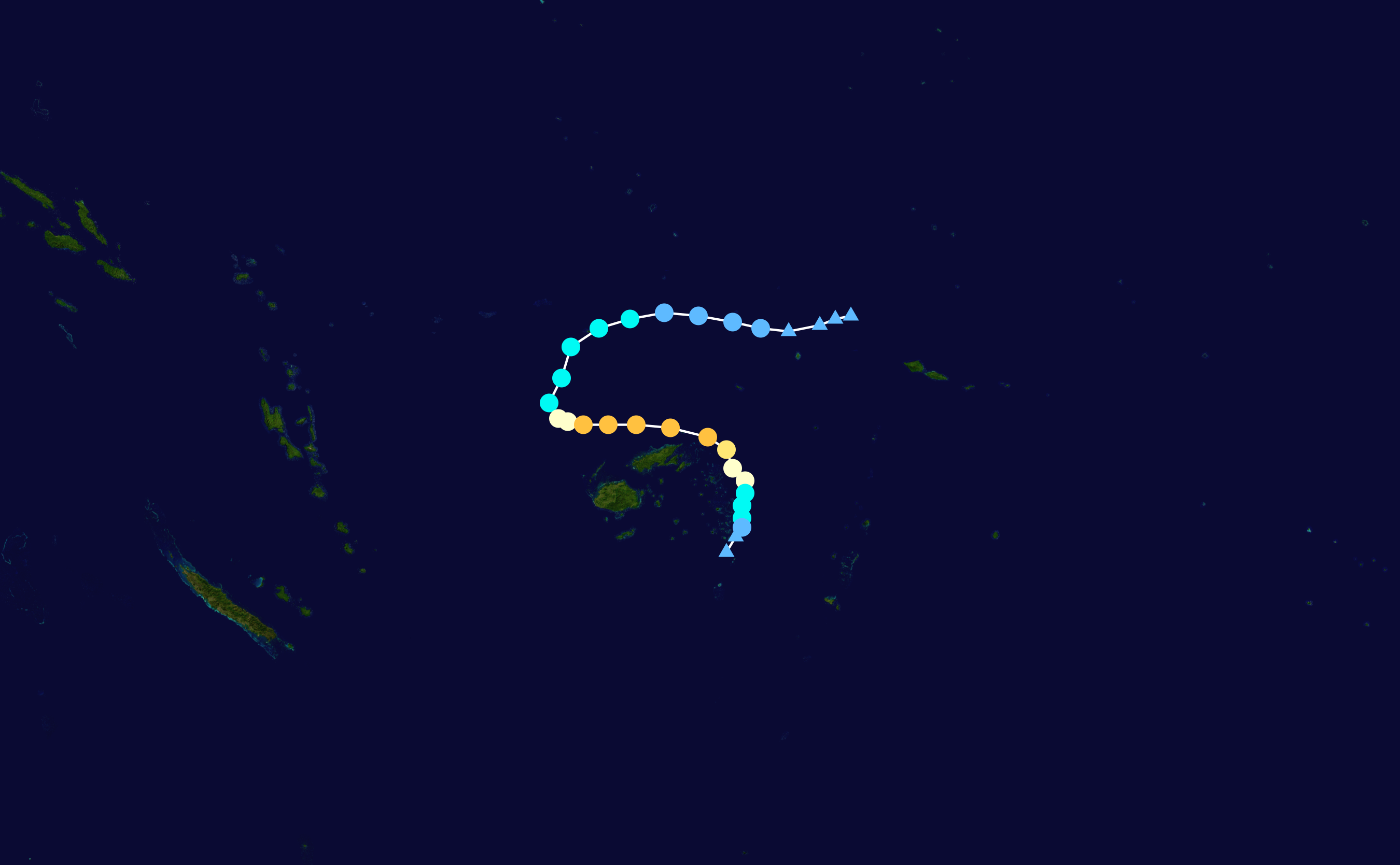
Track map of Severe Tropical Cyclone Daman

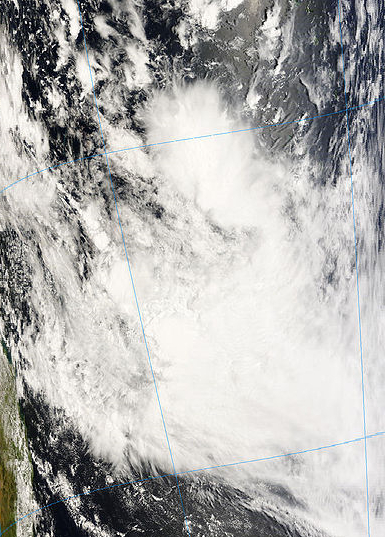
Tropical Disturbance 06F

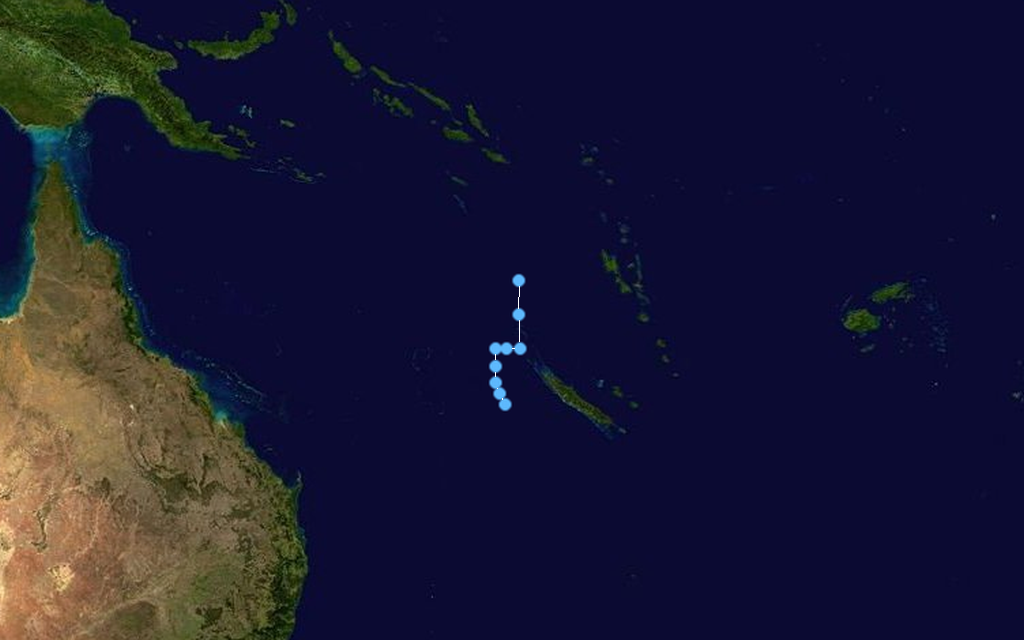
Tropical Disturbance 06F

December 2

- 2100 UTC, (0900 FST, December 3) – RSMC Nadi releases the final advisory on Tropical Depression 03F.

December 3

- 0000 UTC, (1200 FST) – RSMC Nadi reports that Tropical Depression 04F has formed about 360 km (220 mi) to the northwest of Apia, Samoa.

December 4

- 0000 UTC, (1200 FST) – The JTWC designates Tropical Depression 04F as Tropical Cyclone 05P.

December 5

- 0000 UTC, (1200 FST) – The JTWC reports that Tropical Depression 04F (05P) has intensified into a tropical storm.
- 0200 UTC, (1400 FST) – RSMC Nadi reports that Tropical Depression 04F (05P) has intensified into a Category 1 tropical cyclone, and names it Daman.
- 1800 UTC, (0600 FST, December 6) – RSMC Nadi reports that Tropical Cyclone Daman (05P) has intensified into a Category 2 tropical cyclone.

December 6

- 0600 UTC, (1800 FST) – The JTWC reports that Tropical Cyclone Daman has intensified into a Category 1 tropical cyclone.
- 1200 UTC, (0000 FST, December 7) – RSMC Nadi reports that Tropical Cyclone Daman (05P) has intensified into a Category 3 severe tropical cyclone.
- 1800 UTC, (0600 FST, December 7) – The JTWC reports that Tropical Cyclone Daman (05P) has intensified into a Category 3 tropical cyclone.

December 7

- 0000 UTC, (1200 FST) – RSMC Nadi reports that Severe Tropical Cyclone Daman (05P) has intensified into a Category 4 severe tropical cyclone.
- 0600 UTC, (1800 FST) – RSMC Nadi reports that Severe Tropical Cyclone Daman (05P) has reached its peak 10-minute sustained wind speeds of 195 km/h, (120 mph).
- 1500 UTC, (0300 FST, December 8) – Severe Tropical Cyclone Daman (05P) makes landfall on Thikombia island.

December 8

- 0000 UTC, (1200 FST) – RSMC Nadi reports that Severe Tropical Cyclone Daman (05P) has weakened into a Category 3 severe tropical cyclone.
- 0000 UTC, (1200 FST) – The JTWC reports that Tropical Cyclone Daman (05P) has weakened into a Category 2 tropical cyclone.
- 0600 UTC, (1800 FST) – The JTWC reports that Tropical Cyclone Daman (05P) has weakened into a Category 1 tropical cyclone.
- 1200 UTC, (0000 FST, December 9) – RSMC Nadi reports that Severe Tropical Cyclone Daman (05P) has weakened into a Category 2 tropical cyclone.
- 1800 UTC, (0600 FST, December 9) – The JTWC reports that Tropical Cyclone Daman (05P) has weakened into a tropical storm.

December 9

- 0000 UTC, (1200 FST) – RSMC Nadi reports that Tropical Cyclone Daman (05P) has weakened into a Category 1 tropical cyclone.
- 0600 UTC, (1800 FST) – RSMC Nadi reports that Tropical Cyclone Daman (05P) has weakened into a tropical depression.
- 1200 UTC, (0000 FST, December 10) – The JTWC reports that Tropical Storm Daman (05P) has weakened into a tropical depression.
- 1800 UTC, (0600 FST, December 10) – The JTWC reports that Tropical Depression Daman (05P) has weakened into a tropical disturbance.

December 10

- 0000 UTC, (1200 FST) – RSMC Nadi issues the final advisory on Tropical Depression Daman (05P).

December 11

- 0600 UTC, (1800 FST) – RSMC Nadi reports that Tropical Depression 05F has formed about 570 km (355 mi) to the northeast of Pago Pago, in American Samoa.

December 14

- 2100 UTC, (0900 FST, December 15) – RSMC Nadi issues the final advisory on Tropical Depression 05F.

December 26

- 0900 UTC, (2100 FST) – RSMC Nadi reports that Tropical Disturbance 06F has formed about 800 km (500 mi) to the northeast of Alofi in Niue.

December 28

- 0900 UTC, (2100 FST) – RSMC Nadi issues the final advisory on Tropical Disturbance 06F.

=== January ===
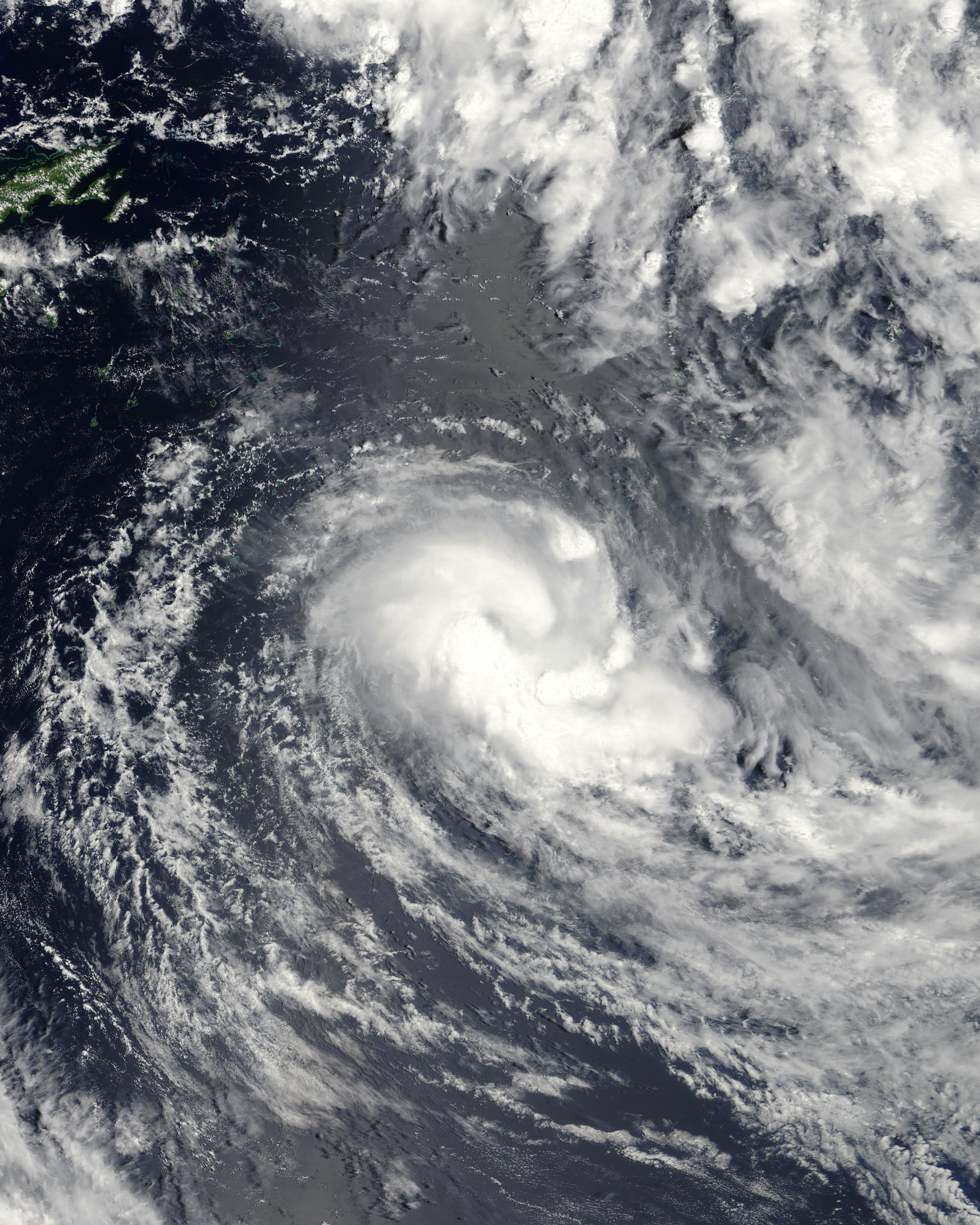
Tropical Cyclone Elisa shortly before being named

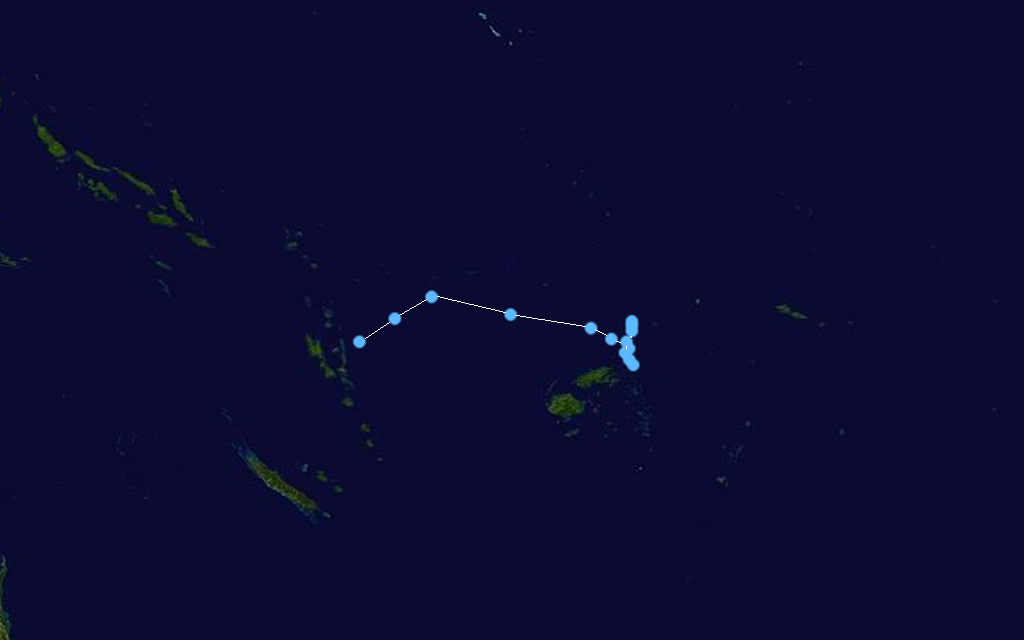
Track map of Tropical Depression 08F

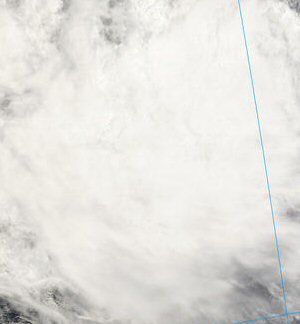
Tropical Depression 09F

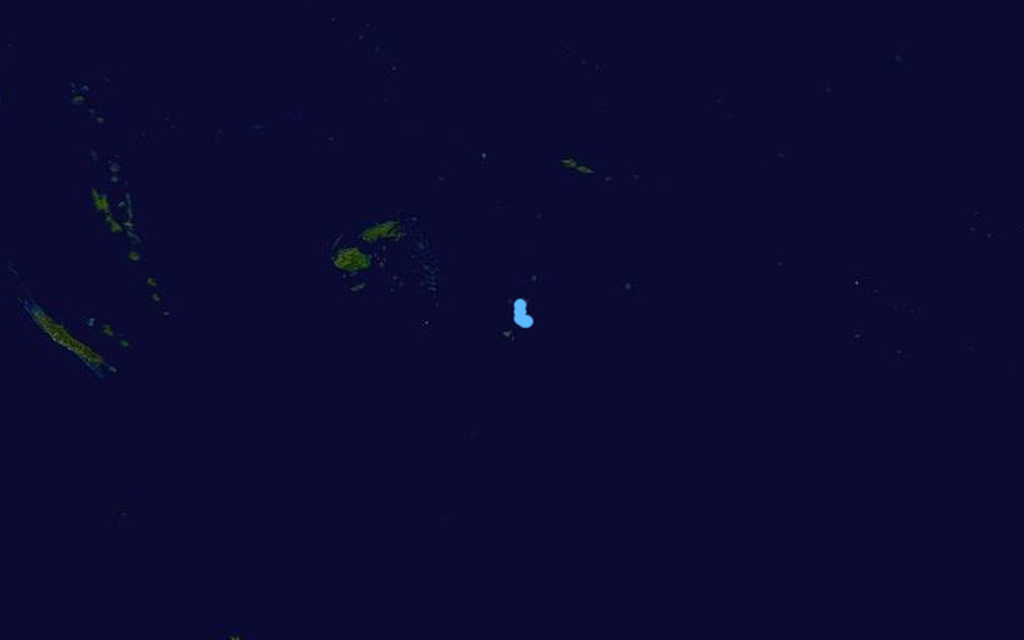
Track map of Tropical Depression 09F

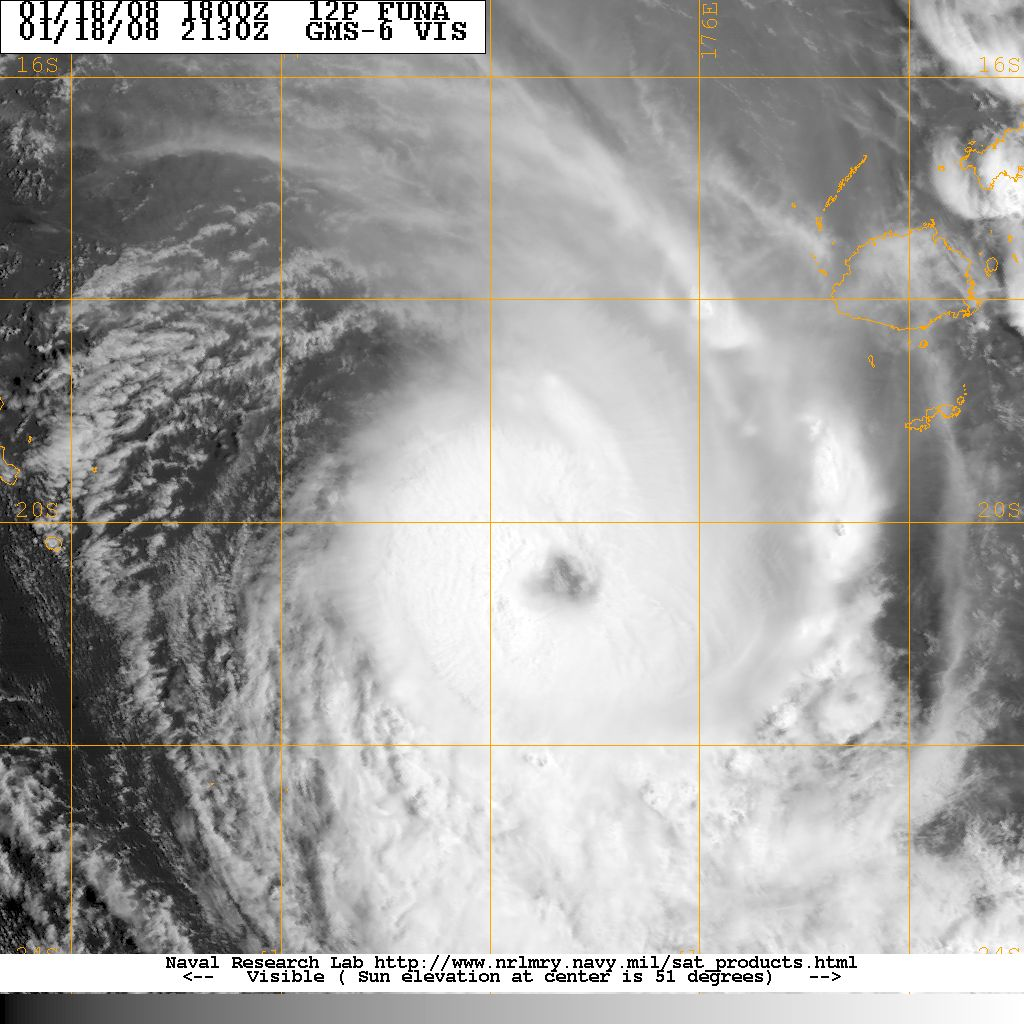
Severe Tropical Cyclone Funa

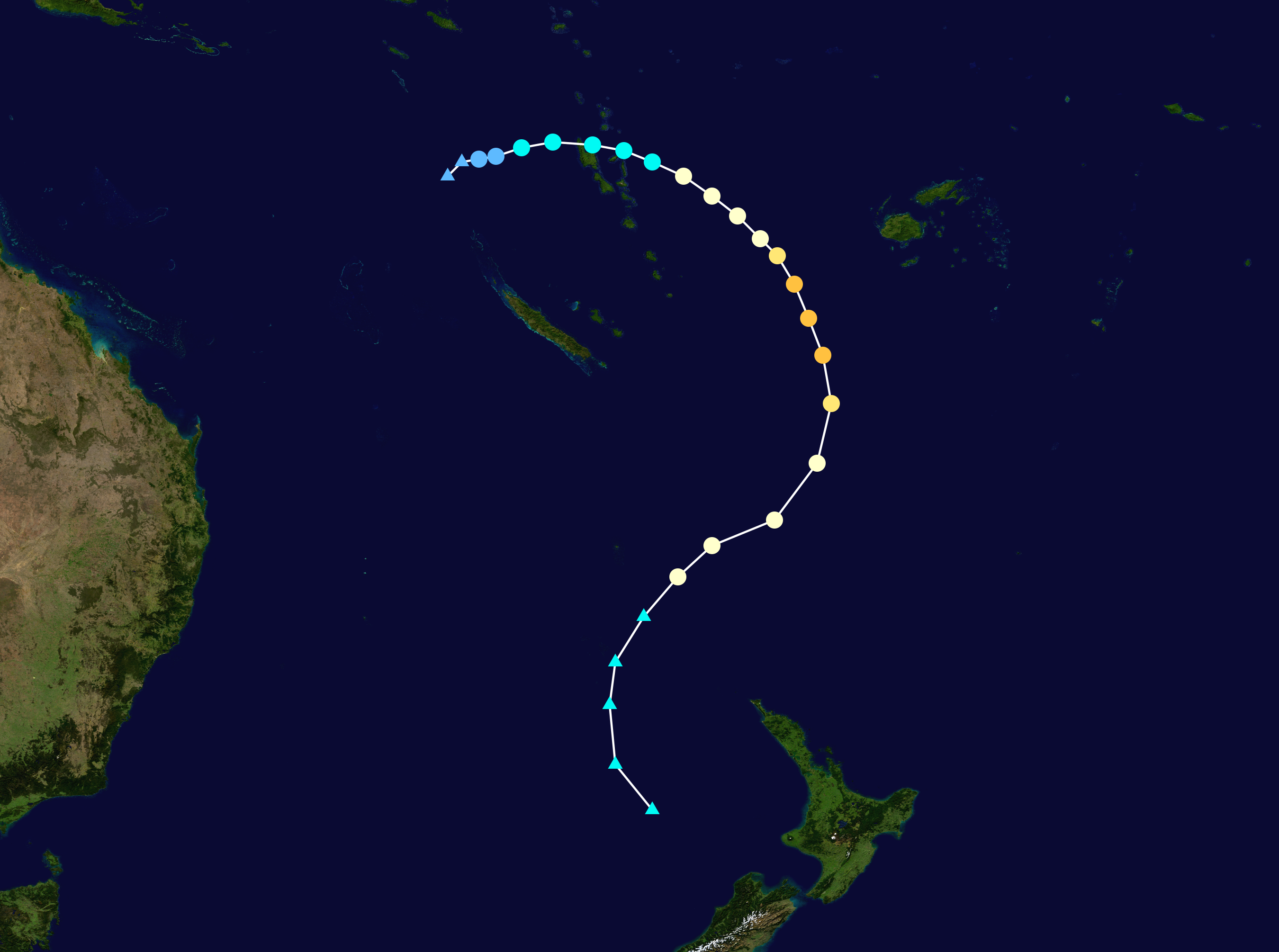
Track map of Severe Tropical Cyclone Funa

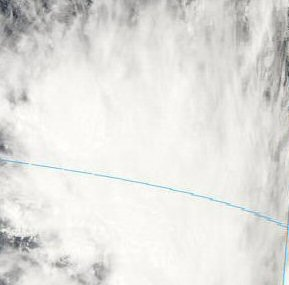
Tropical Depression 11F

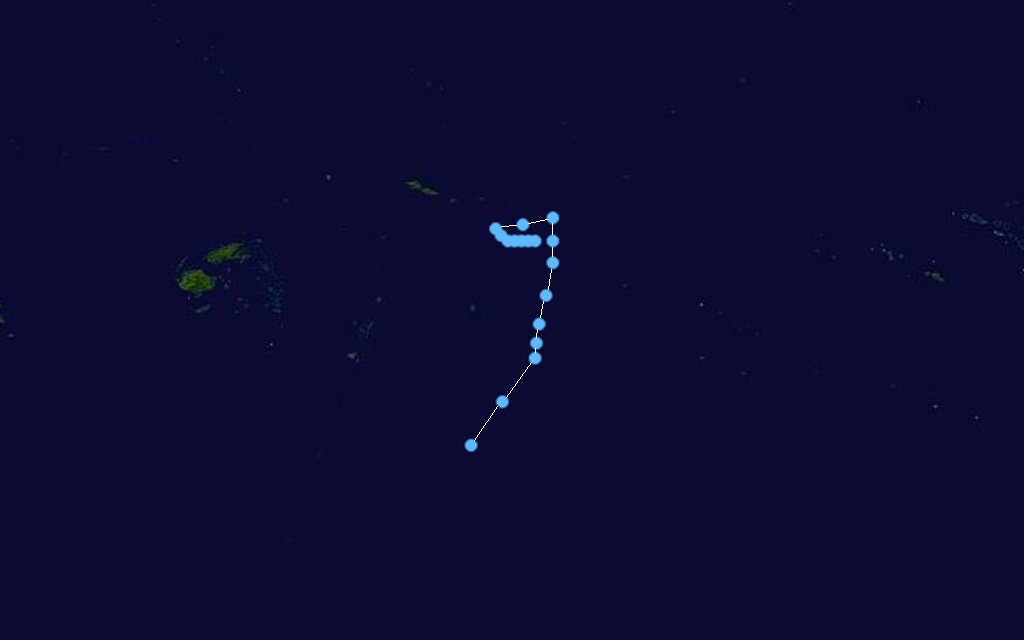
Track map of Tropical Depression 11F

January 7

- 1800 UTC, (0600 FST, January 8) – RSMC Nadi reports that Tropical Depression 07F has formed about 215 km, (130 mi) to the northwest of Vavua Island.

January 9

- 2100 UTC, (0900 FST, January 10) – RSMC Nadi reports that Tropical Depression 08F has formed about 300 km (185 mi) to the northeast of Port Vila, Vanuatu.

January 10

- 0000 UTC, (1200 FST) – RSMC Nadi reports that Tropical Depression 07F has intensified into a Category 1 tropical cyclone and names it Elisa.
- 0000 UTC, (1200 FST) – The JTWC designates Tropical Cyclone Elisa as Tropical Storm 11P.
- 1200 UTC, (0000 FST, January 11) – The JTWC reports that Tropical Cyclone Elisa (11P) has reached its 1-minute peak sustained wind speeds, of 95 km/h, (60 mph).
- 1800 UTC, (0600 FST, January 11) – RSMC Nadi reports that Tropical Cyclone Elisa (11P) has intensified into a Category 2 tropical cyclone.
- 1800 UTC, (0600 FST, January 11) – RSMC Nadi reports that Tropical Cyclone Elisa (11P) has reached its 10-minute peak sustained wind speeds, of 95 km/h, (60 mph).

January 11

- 0600 UTC, (1800 FST) – RSMC Nadi reports that Tropical Cyclone Elisa (11P) has weakened into a Category 1 tropical cyclone.
- 1200 UTC, (0000 FST, January 12) – The JTWC reports that Tropical Cyclone Elisa (11P) has weakened into a tropical depression.
- 1800 UTC, (0600 FST, January 12) – RSMC Nadi reports that Tropical Cyclone Elisa (11P) has weakened into a tropical depression.
- 1800 UTC, (0600 FST, January 12) – RSMC Nadi issues the final advisory on Tropical Cyclone Elisa (11P).

January 12

- 1800 UTC, (0600 FST, January 13) – RSMC Nadi reports that Tropical Depression 08F has weakened into a tropical disturbance.
- 2100 UTC, (0900 FST, January 13) – RSMC Nadi reports that Tropical Disturbance 08F has re-intensified into a tropical depression.
- 2100 UTC, (0900 FST, January 13) – RSMC Nadi reports that Tropical Depression 09F has formed about 160 km (100 mi) to the northeast of Nukuʻalofa.

January 13

- 2100 UTC, (0900 FST, January 14) – RSMC Nadi issues its final advisory on Tropical Depression 09F.

January 14

- 0900 UTC, (2100 FST) – RSMC Nadi reports that Tropical Depression 08F has weakened into a tropical disturbance.
- 0900 UTC, (2100 FST) – RSMC Nadi issues the final advisory on Tropical Disturbance 08F.

January 15

- 0600 UTC, (1800 FST) – RSMC Nadi reports that Tropical Depression 10F has formed about 485 km (300 mi) to the west of Espiritu Santo island, in Vanuatu.
- 1800 UTC, (1800 FST) – The JTWC designates Tropical Depression 10F as Tropical Depression 12P.

January 16

- 0600 UTC, (1800 FST) – RSMC Nadi reports that Tropical Depression 10F (12P) has intensified into a Category 1 tropical cyclone, and names it as Funa.
- 0600 UTC, (1800 FST) – The JTWC reports that Tropical Depression Funa (12P) has intensified into a tropical storm.
- 1800 UTC, (0600 FST, January 17) – RSMC Nadi reports that Tropical Cyclone Funa (12P) has intensified into a Category 2 tropical cyclone.

January 17

- 1200 UTC, (0000 FST, January 18) – The JTWC reports that Tropical Storm Funa (12P) has intensified into a Category 1 tropical cyclone.
- 1500 UTC, (0300 FST, January 18) – Tropical Cyclone Funa (12P) makes landfall near Nokuku, on Espiritu Santo island.

January 18

- 0000 UTC, (1200 FST) – RSMC Nadi reports that Tropical Cyclone Funa (12P) has intensified into a Category 3 severe tropical cyclone.
- 1200 UTC, (0000 FST, January 19) – The JTWC reports that Tropical Cyclone Funa (12P) has intensified into a Category 2 tropical cyclone.
- 1800 UTC, (0600 FST, January 19) – The JTWC reports that Tropical Cyclone Funa (12P) has intensified into a Category 3 tropical cyclone.
- 1800 UTC, (0600 FST, January 19) – The JTWC reports that Tropical Cyclone Funa (12P) has reached its peak 1-minute sustained wind speeds of 195 km/h, (120 mph).

January 19

- 0000 UTC, (1200 FST) – RSMC Nadi reports that Severe Tropical Cyclone Funa (12P) has intensified into a Category 4 severe tropical cyclone.
- 0600 UTC, (1800 FST) – RSMC Nadi reports that Severe Tropical Cyclone Funa has reached its peak 10-minute sustained wind speeds of 175 km/h (110 mph).
- 1200 UTC, (0000 FST, January 20) – The JTWC reports that Tropical Cyclone Funa (12P) has intensified into a Category 2 tropical cyclone.
- 1800 UTC, (0600 FST, January 20) – RSMC Nadi transfers primary warning responsibility of Severe Tropical Cyclone Funa to TCWC Wellington.
- 1800 UTC, (0600 FST, January 20) – TCWC Wellington reports that Severe Tropical Cyclone Funa has weakened into a Category 3 severe tropical cyclone.
- 1800 UTC, (0600 FST, January 20) – The JTWC reports that Tropical Cyclone Funa (12P) has weakened into a Category 1 tropical cyclone.

January 20

- 0600 UTC, (1800 FST) – The JTWC reports that Tropical Cyclone Funa (12P) has weakened into a tropical storm.
- 1800 UTC, (0600 FST, January 21) – TCWC Wellington reports that Tropical Cyclone Funa has transitioned into an extratropical cyclone.
- 1800 UTC, (0600 FST, January 21) – The JTWC reports that Tropical Storm Funa (12P) has weakened into a tropical depression.
- 2100 UTC, (0900 FST, January 21) – RSMC Nadi reports that Tropical Depression 11F has formed about 330 km (200 mi) to the southeast of Pago Pago, American Samoa.

January 21

- 1800 UTC, (0600 FST, January 21) – TCWC Wellington issues the final advisory on Extratropical Cyclone Funa, as it dissipates over New Zealand.

January 22

- 2100 UTC, (0900 FST, January 23) – RSMC Nadi reports that Tropical Depression 11F has weakened into a tropical depression.

January 24

- 0000 UTC, (1200 FST) – RSMC Nadi transfers primary warning responsibility of Tropical Depression 11F to TCWC Wellington.
- 1800 UTC, (0600 UTC, January 25) – TCWC Wellington issues their final advisory on Tropical Depression 11F.

January 26

- 0000 UTC, (1200 FST) – RSMC Nadi reports that Tropical Depression 12F has formed about 720 km (445 mi) to the northeast of Nadi, Fiji.
- 1800 UTC, (0600 FST, January 27) – The JTWC designates Tropical Depression 12F as Tropical Depression 15P.

January 27

- 1800 UTC, (0600 FST, January 28) – The JTWC reports that Tropical Depression 12F (15P) has intensified into a tropical storm.

January 28

- 0000 UTC, (1200 FST, January 28) – For humanitarian reasons, RSMC Nadi names Tropical Depression 12F (15P) as Gene.
- 0600 UTC, (1800 FST. January 28) – Tropical Cyclone Gene (15P) makes landfall near Nanukuloa, on Viti Levu island, Fiji.
- 0600 UTC, (1800 FST, January 28) – RSMC Nadi reports that Tropical Depression Gene (15P) has intensified into a Category 1 tropical cyclone.

January 29

- 0000 UTC, (1200 FST, January 29) – RSMC Nadi reports that Tropical Cyclone Gene (15P) has intensified into a Category 2 tropical cyclone.
- 1200 UTC, (0000 FST, January 30) – RSMC Nadi reports that Tropical Cyclone Gene (15P) has weakened into a Category 1 tropical cyclone.
- 1800 UTC, (0600 FST, January 30) – RSMC Nadi reports that Tropical Cyclone Gene (15P) has re-intensified into a Category 1 tropical Cyclone.

January 30

- 0600 UTC, (1800 FST) – The JTWC reports that Tropical Storm Gene (15P) has intensified into a Category 1 tropical cyclone.
- 1200 UTC, (0000 FST, January 31) – RSMC Nadi reports that Tropical Cyclone Gene (15P) has intensified into a Category 3 severe tropical cyclone.
- 1800 UTC, (0600 FST, January 31) – The JTWC reports that Tropical Cyclone Gene (15P) has intensified into a Category 3 tropical cyclone.

January 31

- 1200 UTC, (0000 FST, January 31) – The JTWC reports that Tropical Cyclone Gene (15P) has intensified into a Category 3 tropical cyclone.
- 1800 UTC, (0600 FST, January 31) – RSMC Nadi reports that Severe Tropical Cyclone Gene (15P) has reached its peak 10-minute sustained wind speeds of 160 km/h, (100 mph).
- 1800 UTC, (0600 FST, January 31) – The JTWC reports that Tropical Cyclone Gene (15P) has reached its peak 1-minute sustained wind speeds of 185 km/h (115 mph).

=== February ===
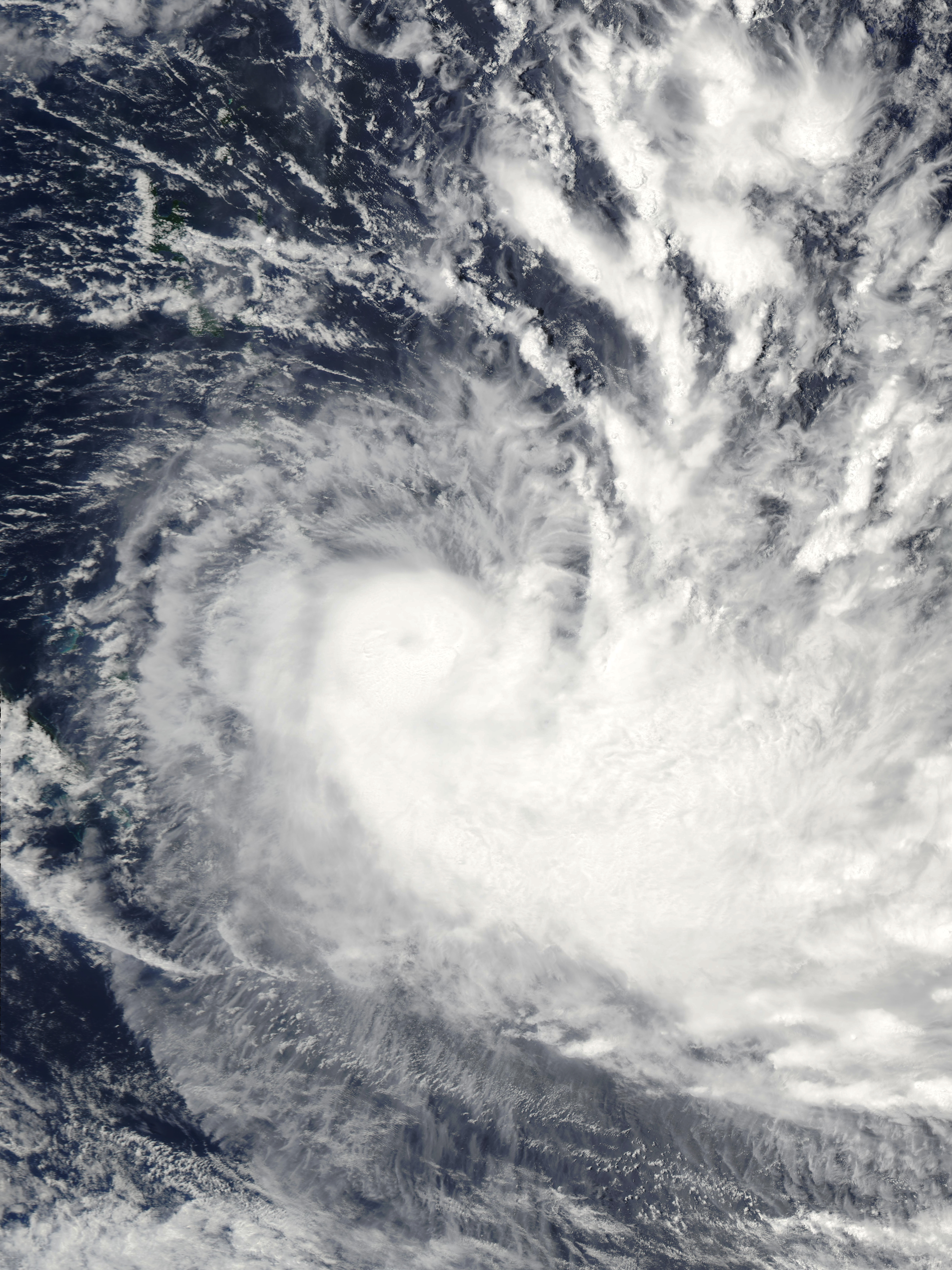
Severe Tropical Cyclone Gene

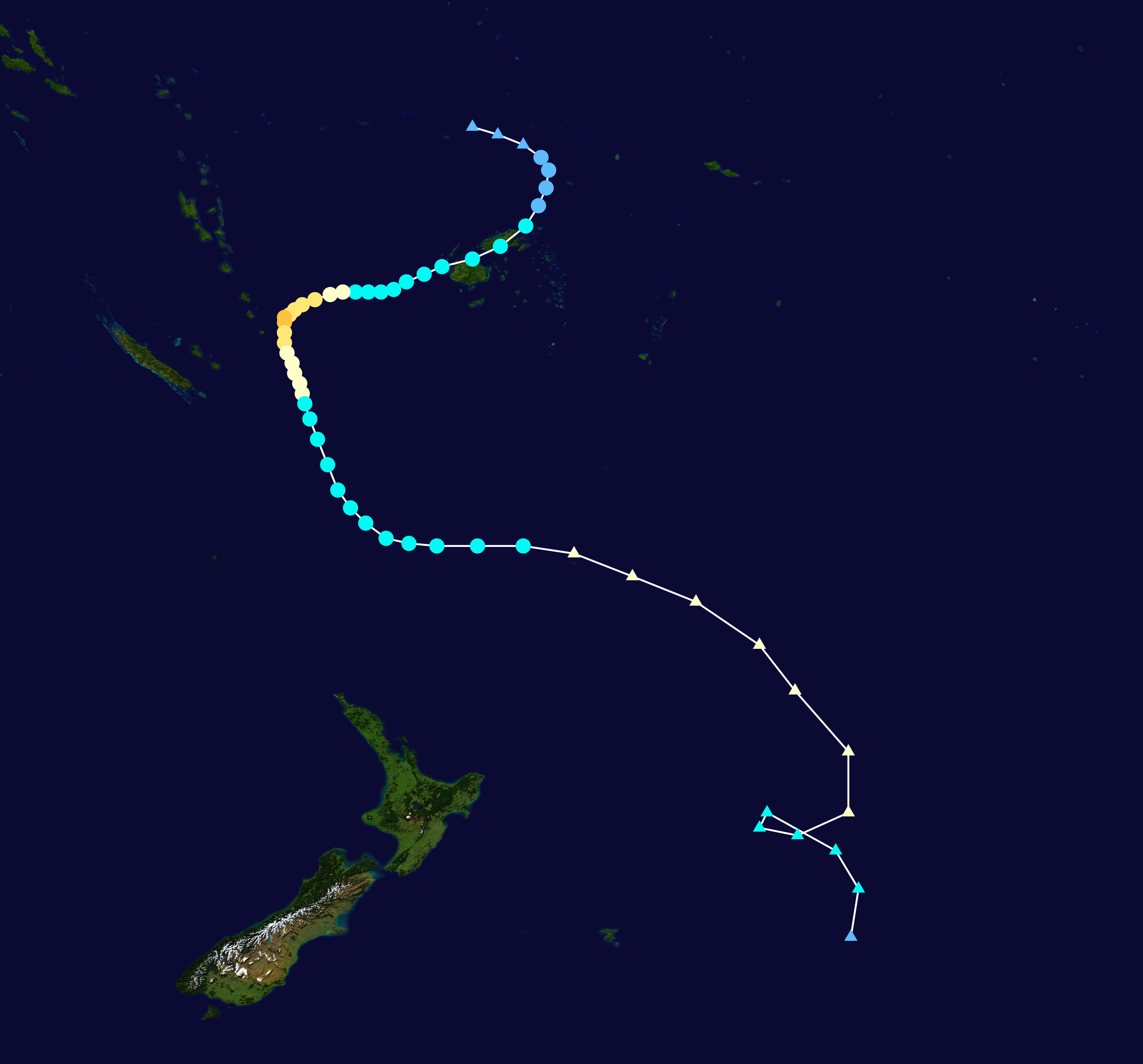
Track map of Severe Tropical Cyclone Gene

February 1

- 0600 UTC, (1800 FST) – The JTWC reports that Tropical Cyclone Gene (15P) has weakened into a Category 2 tropical cyclone.
- 1800 UTC, (0600 FST, February 2) – The JTWC reports that Tropical Cyclone Gene (15P) has weakened into a Category 1 tropical cyclone.

February 2

- 1200 UTC, (0000 FST, February 3) – RSMC Nadi reports that Severe Tropical Cyclone Gene (15P) has weakened into a Category 2 tropical cyclone.

February 3

- 0000 UTC, (1200 FST) – The JTWC reports that Tropical Cyclone Gene (15P) has weakened into a tropical storm.
- 1800 UTC, (0600 FST, February 4) – RSMC Nadi transfers primary warning responsibility of Tropical Cyclone Gene to TCWC Wellington.
- 1800 UTC, (0600 FST, February 4) – TCWC Wellington reports that Tropical Cyclone Gene (15P) has re–intensified into a Category 3 severe tropical cyclone.

February 4

- 0600 UTC (1800 FST, February 5) – TCWC Wellington reports that Tropical Cyclone Gene (15P) has weakened into a Category 2 tropical cyclone.

February 6

- 0000 UTC, (1200 FST) – TCWC Wellington reports that Tropical Cyclone Gene (15P) has re–intensified into a Category 3 severe tropical cyclone.
- 0000 UTC, (1200 FST) – The JTWC reports that Tropical Storm Gene (15P) has transitioned into an extratropical cyclone.
- 0600 UTC, (1800 FST) – TCWC Wellington reports that Tropical Cyclone Gene (15P) has transitioned into an extratropical cyclone.

February 9

- 0000 UTC, (1200 FST) – TCWC Wellington release the final advisory on Extratropical Cyclone Gene.

February 17

- 1800 UTC, (0600 FST, February 18) – RSMC Nadi reports that Tropical Depression 13F has formed about 1250 km (775 mi) to the southeast of Pago Pago in American Samoa.

February 18

- 2100 UTC, (0900 FST, February 19) – RSMC Nadi issues the final advisory on Tropical Depression 13F.

=== March ===
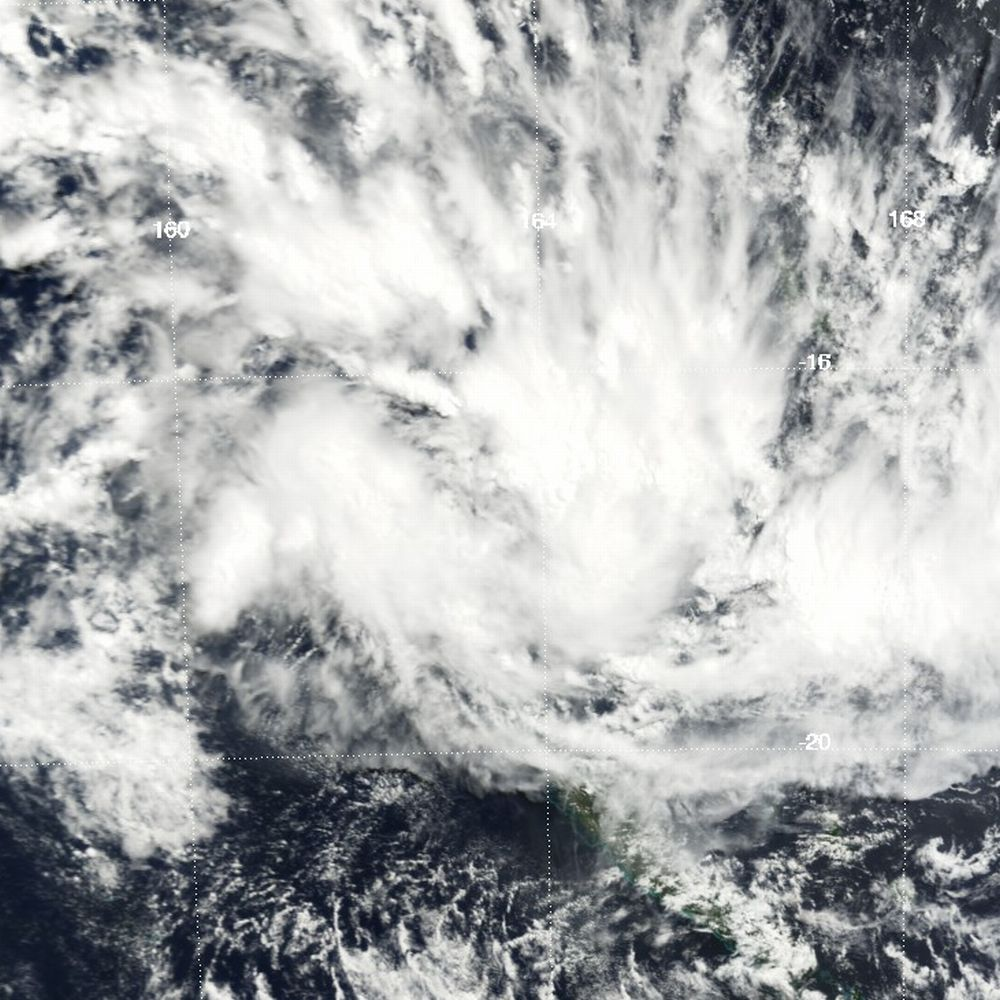
Tropical Depression 14F

March 19

- 1800 UTC (0600 FST, March 20) – RSMC Nadi reports that Tropical Disturbance 14F has formed about 500 km (310 mi) to the west of Port Vila, Vanuatu.
- 2100 UTC (0900 FST, March 20) – RSMC Nadi reports that Tropical Disturbance 14F has intensified into a tropical depression.

March 20

- 0000 UTC, (1200 FST) – The JTWC designates Tropical Depression 14F as Tropical Depression 24P.
- 1800 UTC, (0600 FST, March 21) – The JTWC reports that Tropical Depression 14F (24P) has intensified into a tropical storm.
- 1800 UTC, (0600 FST, March 21) – The JTWC reports that Tropical Storm 14F (24P) has reached its peak 1-minute sustained wind speeds of 65 km/h (40 mph).

March 21

- 0000 UTC, (1200 FST) – Tropical Depression 14F (24P) makes landfall on the main island of New Caledonia.
- 1800 UTC, (0600 FST, March 22) – The JTWC reports that Tropical Storm 14F (24P) has weakened into a tropical depression.

March 22

- 1800 UTC, (0600 FST, March 23) – RSMC Nadi reports that Tropical Depression 14F (24P) has weakened into a tropical disturbance.
- 1800 UTC, (0600 FST, March 23) – The JTWC reports that Tropical Depression 14F (24P) has weakened into a tropical disturbance.

March 23
2100 UTC, (0900 FST, March 24) – RSMC Nadi issues the final advisory on Tropical Disturbance 14F.

=== April ===
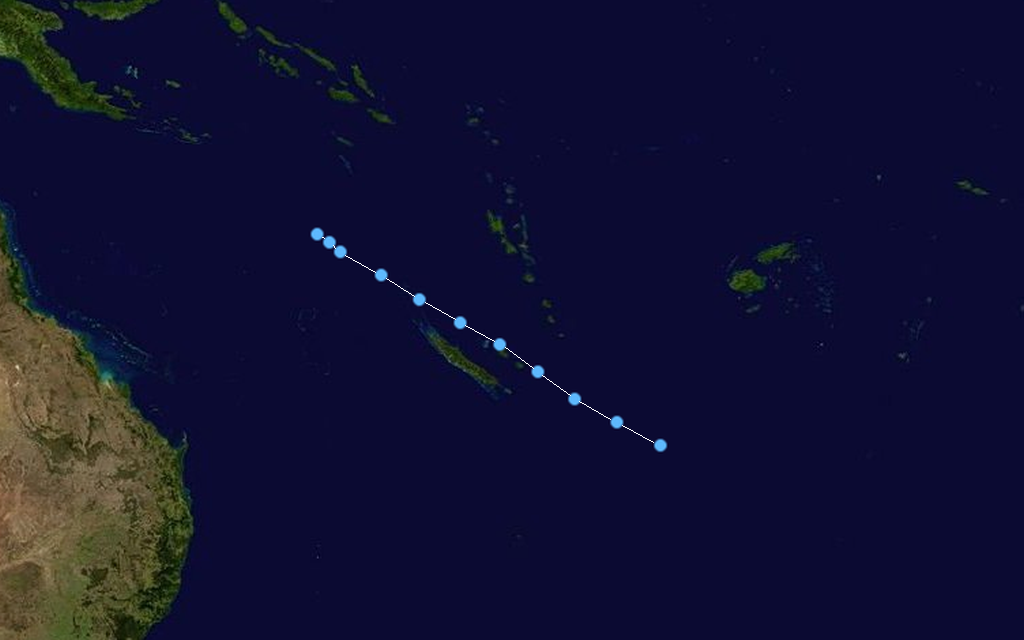
Track map of Tropical Depression 15F

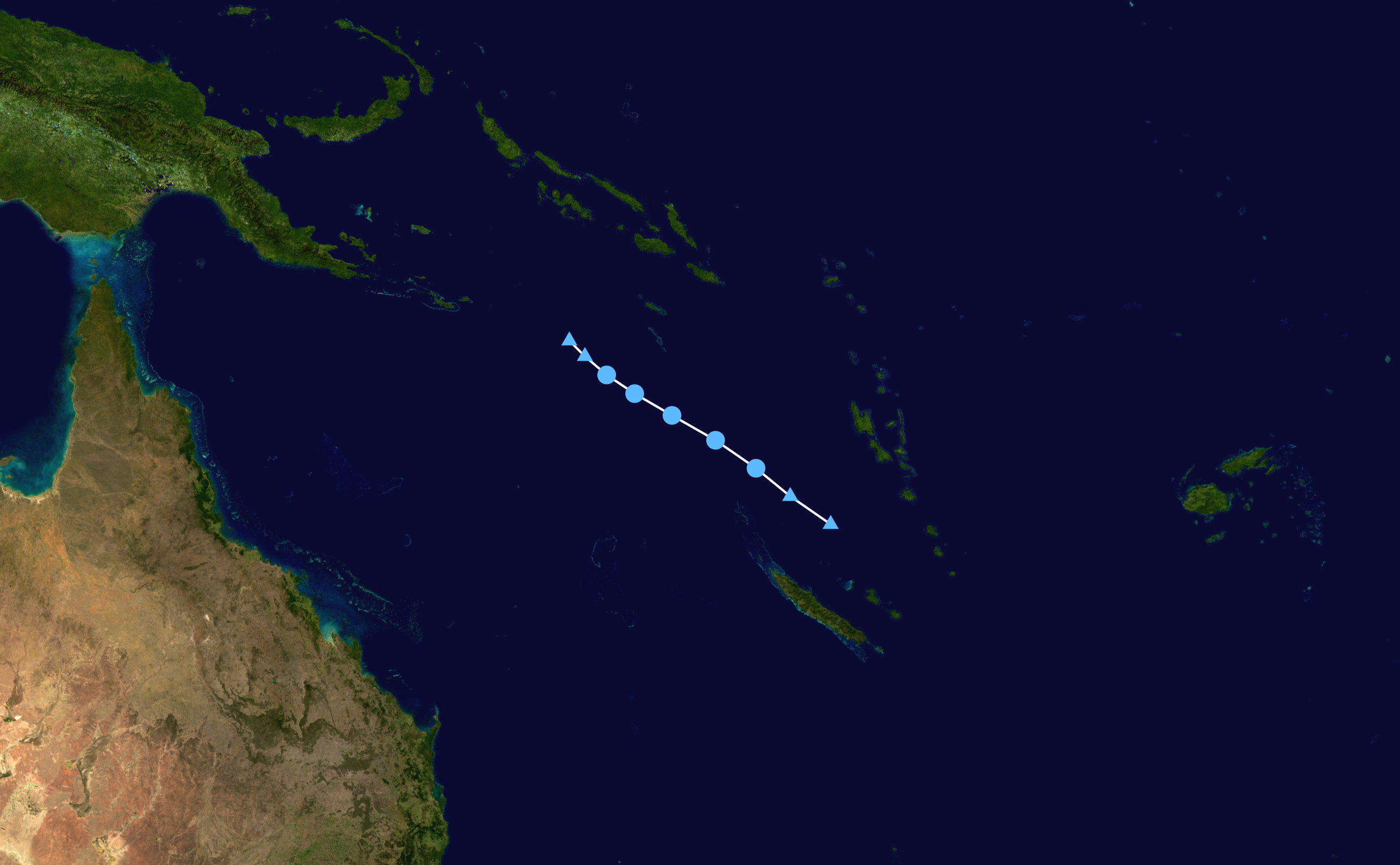
Track map of Tropical Depression 16F

April 4

- 1800 UTC, (0600 FST, April 5) – RSMC Nadi reports that Tropical Disturbance 15F has formed about 1000 km, (620 mi) to the west of Vanuatu.
- 2300 UTC, (1100 FST, April 5) – RSMC Nadi reports that Tropical Disturbance 15F has intensified into a tropical depression.

April 7

- 0900 UTC, (2100 FST) – RSMC Nadi issues the final advisory on Tropical Depression 15F.

April 17

- 1200 UTC, (0000 FST, April 18) – The JTWC reports that Tropical Depression 27P has formed about 1115 km (695 mi) to the west of Port Vila, Vanuatu.
- 1800 UTC, (0600 FST, April 18) – RSMC Nadi designates Tropical Depression 27P as Tropical Depression 16F.
- 1800 UTC, (0600 FST, April 18) – The JTWC reports that Tropical Depression 16F (27P) has reached its peak 1-minute sustained wind speeds of 55 km/h, (35 mph).

April 18

- 1800 UTC, (0600 FST, April 18) – The JTWC reports that Tropical Depression 16F (27P) has weakened into a tropical disturbance.

April 19

- 2100 UTC, (0900 FST, April 20) – RSMC Nadi issues the final advisory on Tropical Depression 16F.

April 30

- 1200 UTC, (0000 FST, May 1) – The 2007–08 South Pacific tropical cyclone season officially ends.

== See also ==
- 2007–08 South Pacific cyclone season
- Atlantic hurricane season timelines: 2007, 2008
- Pacific hurricane season timelines: 2007, 2008
- Pacific typhoon season timelines: 2007, 2008
- North Indian Ocean cyclone season timelines: 2007, 2008
- Timeline of the 2007–08 South-West Indian Ocean cyclone season
- Timeline of the 2007–08 Australian region cyclone season
