= Typhoon Kong-rey (2007) =

Pacific typhoon in 2007

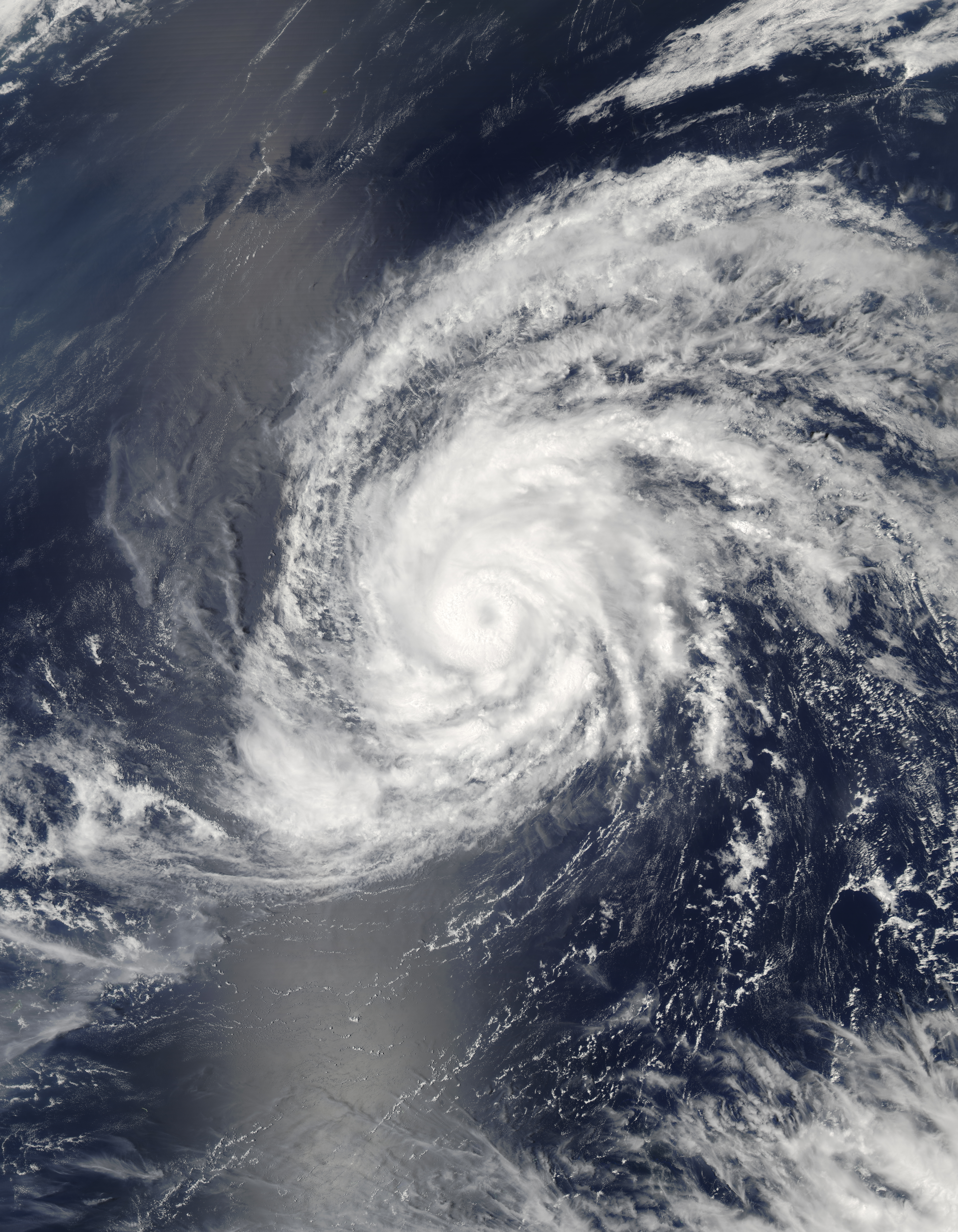
- Typhoon Kong-rey near peak intensity on April 3

Meteorological history
- Formed: March 30, 2007
- Extratropical: April 6, 2007
- Dissipated: April 7, 2007

Typhoon
- 10-minute sustained (JMA)
- Highest winds: 150 km/h (90 mph)
- Lowest pressure: 960 hPa (mbar); 28.35 inHg

Category 3-equivalent typhoon
- 1-minute sustained (SSHWS/JTWC)
- Highest winds: 185 km/h (115 mph)
- Lowest pressure: 948 hPa (mbar); 27.99 inHg

Overall effects
- Fatalities: None reported
- Damage: $10,000 (2007 USD)
- Areas affected: Mariana Islands
- IBTrACS
- Part of the 2007 Pacific typhoon season

Typhoon Kong-rey was a moderate typhoon that affected Guam and the Northern Mariana Islands in early April 2007. The first named storm of the 2007 Pacific typhoon season, Kong-rey became the earliest-occurring typhoon since Typhoon Sudal in 2004. At its peak, it was considered to be a Category 2-equivalent typhoon by the Joint Typhoon Warning Center, though re-analysis increased it to a Category 3-equivalent. Typhoon Kong-rey caused about $10,000 in damages and no injuries along its path.

== Meteorological history ==
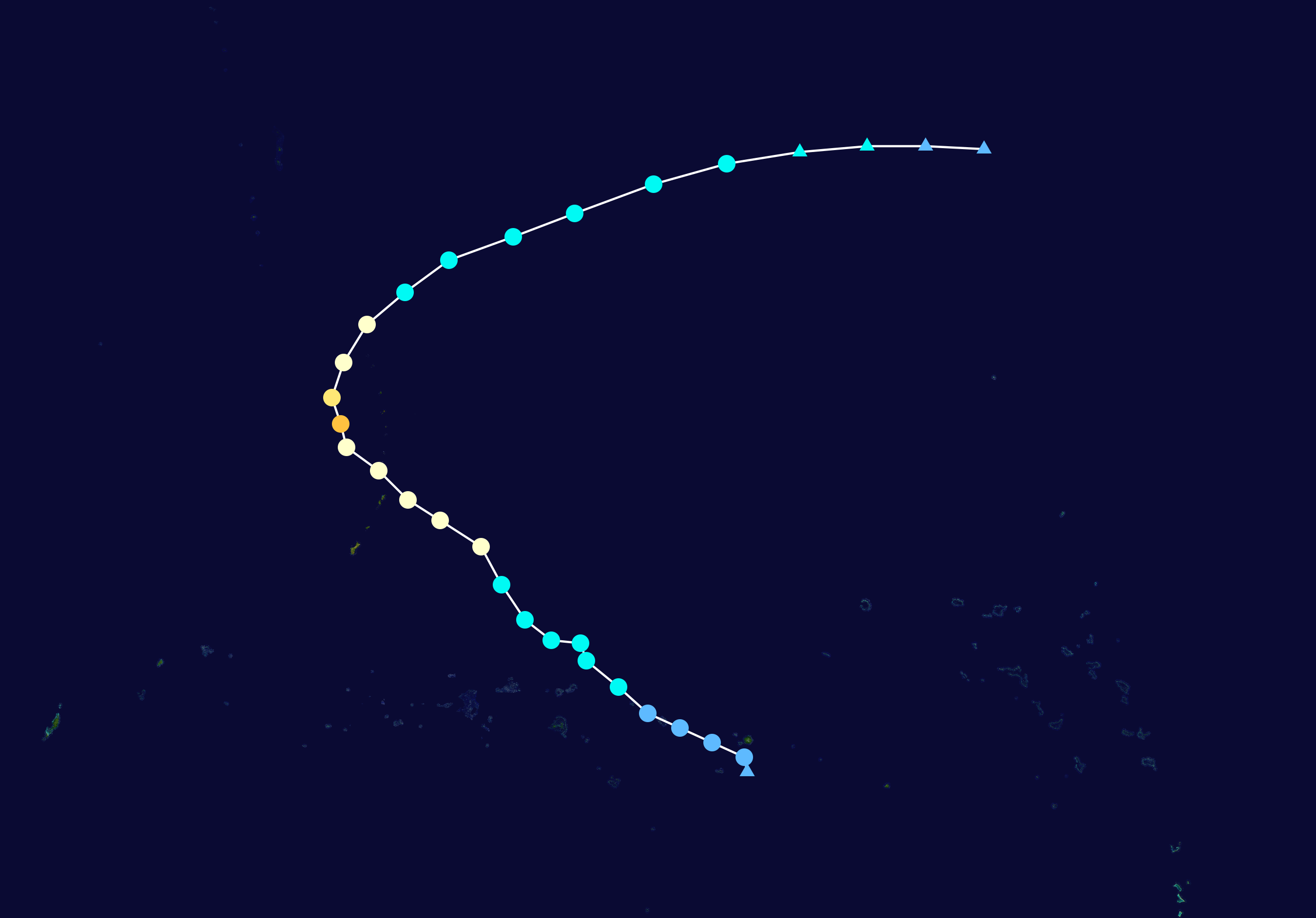
Map plotting the storm's track and intensity, according to the Saffir–Simpson scale Map key Saffir–Simpson scale Tropical depression (≤38 mph, ≤62 km/h) Tropical storm (39–73 mph, 63–118 km/h) Category 1 (74–95 mph, 119–153 km/h) Category 2 (96–110 mph, 154–177 km/h) Category 3 (111–129 mph, 178–208 km/h) Category 4 (130–156 mph, 209–251 km/h) Category 5 (≥157 mph, ≥252 km/h) Unknown Storm type Tropical cyclone Subtropical cyclone Extratropical cyclone, remnant low, tropical disturbance, or monsoon depression

On March 26, the Naval Research Laboratory identified a broad area of low pressure in the Western North Pacific. It moved west-northwestward over the next few days, slowly gaining organisation. According to the Japan Meteorological Agency's best-track, it became a tropical depression on March 30. The next day, the Joint Typhoon Warning Center issued a Tropical Cyclone Formation Alert due to an increased consolidation of the low-level circulation of the system. The intensity was increased to 30 knots at the same time by the JMA, as the depression moved westward.

The JTWC issued its first warning on Tropical Depression 01W late that evening local time. As it continued to strengthen, the JTWC upgraded it to a tropical storm, the first of the season. The JMA followed suit, and named the system Kong-rey. (Note: The name Kong-rey (Khmer: កង្រី, [kɑŋ.ˈrəj]) was contributed by Cambodia and refers to a girl from a Khmer legend, as well as a mountain named after that girl in Khmer.) Kong-rey continued to track towards the Mariana Islands, all the while continuing to organise, causing the JMA upgraded it to a severe tropical storm on the morning of April 2 local time, with the JTWC declaring it a typhoon later that evening. It then turned poleward, and starting moving towards the Northern Mariana Islands, passing through the islands on April 3. The JMA then upgraded it to a typhoon as it headed away from the islands.

As Kong-rey began to take a turn to the north and east, it developed a ragged 16-nautical-mile-wide (30 km; 18 mi) eye. Operationally, its peak was estimated at 165 km/h (103 mph), though in post-season analysis, it was considered to have reached peak winds of 185 km/h (115 mph). It strengthened slightly further before encountering strong wind shear and colder sea surface temperatures, causing core convection to rapidly weaken, and was downgraded back to a severe tropical storm on April 4. As Kong-rey accelerated towards the northeast, it encountered a hostile environment related to a midlatitude trough. It began undergoing extratropical transition early on April 5 and the JTWC issued its final warning. The JMA issued its final warning on the morning of April 6 after it had completed extratropical transition.

== Preparations and impact ==
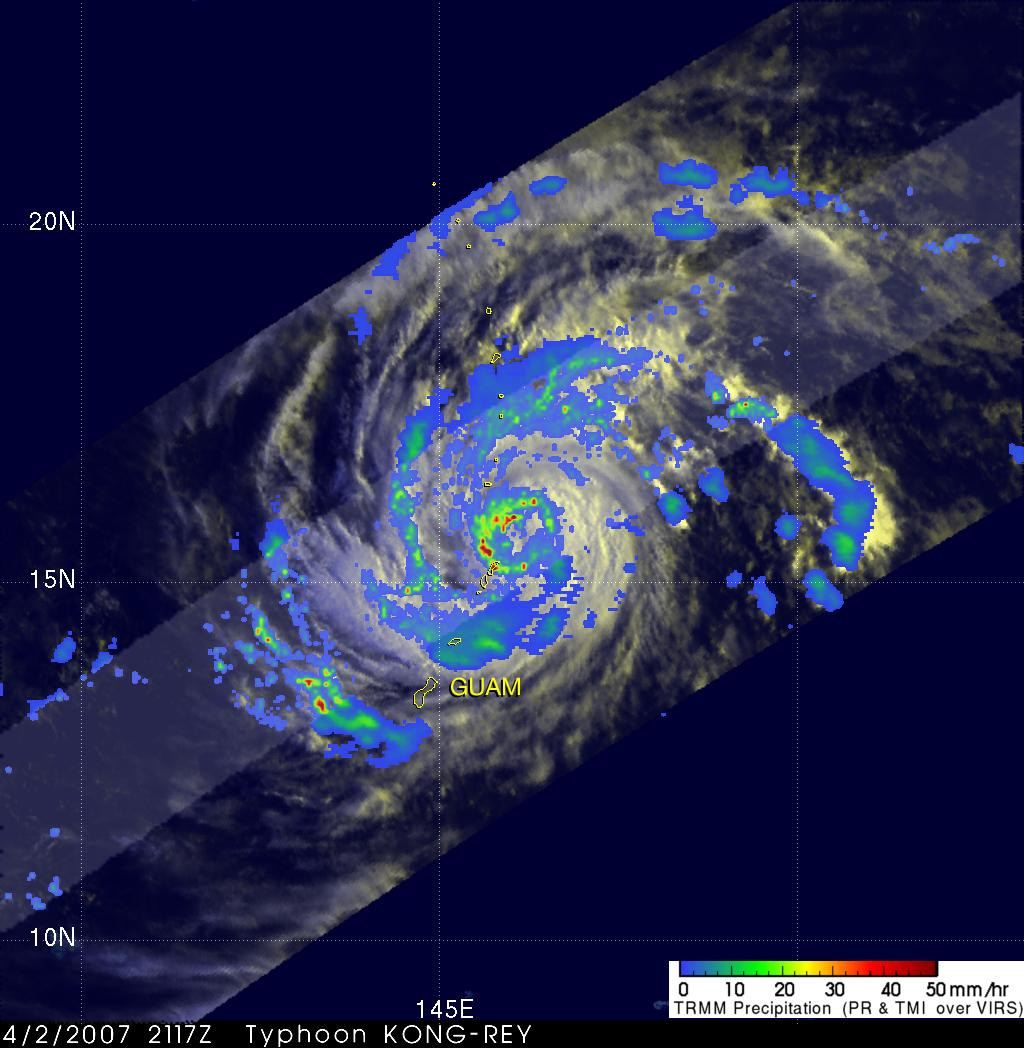
TRMM image of Typhoon Kong-rey taken on April 2 as it approach the Mariana Islands, showing the intensity of rainfall associated with the storm

As Kong-rey headed towards the Mariana Islands, a typhoon watch was issued for Guam, Rota, Tinian and Saipan in the morning of April 1 local time. Tropical Cyclone Condition of Readiness 3 was declared by the Governor of Guam at 2 p.m. local time (0400 UTC) the same day, advising residents to prepare emergency kits, review disaster plans and take necessary precautions as the storm approached. The typhoon watch was upgraded to a typhoon warning later in the day as Kong-rey approached the islands. Condition of Readiness 2 was declared across all four islands, and the Port Authority of Guam opened its Harbor of Refuge to house stranded boats.

Radar image from Guam of Kong-rey passing through the Mariana Islands on April 3

The typhoon warnings for Guam were cancelled on April 2 after the National Weather Service office in Guam noted that damaging winds were now not expected on the island. The typhoon warning for Rota was downgraded to a tropical storm warning at the same time, and a typhoon warning was newly issued for Agrihan. Residents on Agrihan, Pagan and Alamagan were advised to take precautionary measures. In Saipan, Northern Mariana Islands Governor Benigno R. Fitial released non-essential government staff in the afternoon of April 2, as the Emergency Management Office began opening shelters. Furthermore, scoping meetings for an Environmental Impact Statement regarding military relocation were postponed by a fortnight. Several flights were also cancelled across the islands.

The tropical storm warning for Rota and typhoon warning for Tinian and Saipan were discontinued on the morning of April 3 as the storm no longer posed a wind threat, and Fitial declared an all-clear for the islands. Condition of Readiness 1 was maintained in Agrihan, Pagan and Alamagan until late on April 3 local time, but as the storm passed, all warnings and watches were discontinued by the morning of April 4. The highest gust recorded on Guam was 28 knots (32 mph; 52 km/h) at Andersen Air Force Base, while in the Northern Mariana Islands Agrihan reported the highest gust, of 67 kn (77 mph; 124 km/h). The lowest pressure recorded in the island chain was 995.3 hPa on Saipan, although a few readings taken on other islands may not have been the lowest recorded pressure. Only minimal rainfall fell on Guam from Kong-rey. The maximum 24-hour rainfall total on the islands was measured at 2.7 inches (69 mm) at Saipan, although the total rainfall throughout the storm was heaviest on Agrihan, which recorded 3.58 inches (91 mm) over thirty hours from April 3 to April 4 local time.

The storm delayed a congressional delegation to Guam, which was to be led by Texan congressman Solomon P. Ortiz. The effect of strong winds on agriculture was minimal. Several minor power outages occurred, mostly in Saipan. The cost of the power outages totaled to $10,000 (2007 USD).

== See also ==
- Other tropical cyclones named Kong-rey
- Timeline of the 2007 Pacific typhoon season
- Severe Tropical Storm Kulap (2005)
