= List of storms named Daman =

The name Daman has been used for three tropical cyclones in the South Pacific region of the Southern Hemisphere:

- Cyclone Daman (1981) – a Category 2 tropical cyclone that not made landfall.
- Cyclone Daman (1992) – a Category 3 severe tropical cyclone that minimal affected the Vanuatu and New Caledonia.
- Cyclone Daman (2007) – a Category 4 severe tropical cyclone brushed by the Fijian island of Cikobia-i-Lau, causing damage to housing, crops and vegetation.
