= Timeline of the 2007 Pacific typhoon season =

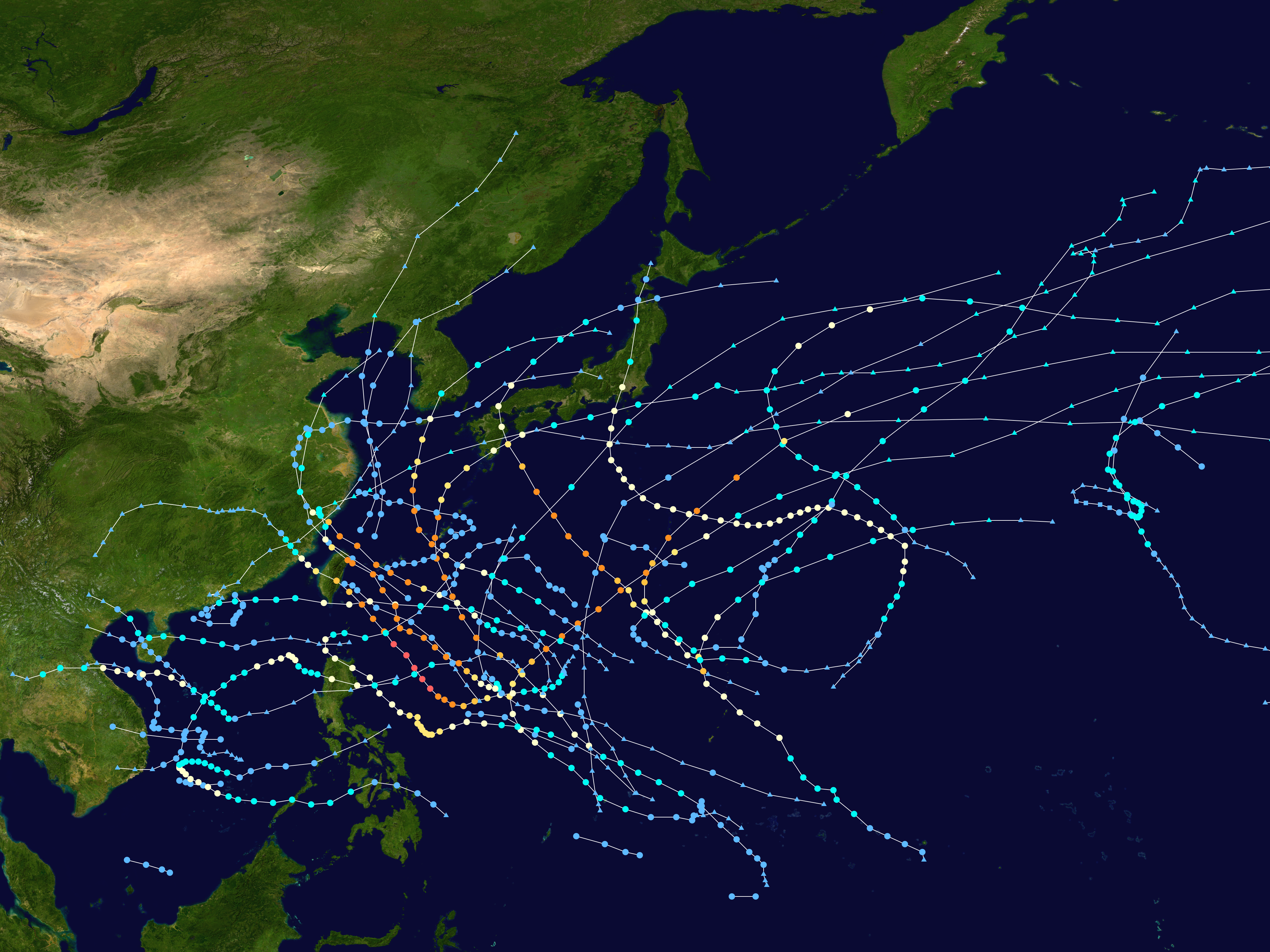
- Season summary map

Season boundaries
- First system formed: January 5, 2007
- Last system dissipated: November 29, 2007

Strongest system
- Name: Sepat
- Maximum winds: 205 km/h (125 mph) (10-minute sustained)
- Lowest pressure: 910 hPa (mbar)

Longest lasting system
- Name: Sepat
- Duration: 12 days
Storm articles
- Typhoon Kong-rey (2007)
- Tropical Storm Toraji (2007)
- Typhoon Pabuk (2007)
- Typhoon Sepat
- Typhoon Fitow (2007)
- Typhoon Nari (2007)
- Typhoon Wipha (2007)
- Tropical Storm Lekima (2007)
- Typhoon Krosa (2007)
- Tropical Storm Faxai (2007)
- Typhoon Mitag (2007)

This timeline documents all events that have taken place during the 2007 Pacific typhoon season. This article is limited to the Western Pacific basin which is located north of the equator and between 100°E and the International Date Line. Systems that reach tropical storm intensity are assigned a name by the Japan Meteorological Agency (JMA). Tropical depressions that form within the basin are assigned a number with a "W" suffix by the Joint Typhoon Warning Center (JTWC). Additionally, the Philippine Atmospheric, Geophysical and Astronomical Services Administration (PAGASA) assigns names to tropical cyclones (including tropical depressions) that either form in or move into its self-defined area of responsibility, which runs from 135°E to 115°E and 5°N to 25°N.

The following timeline documents the major events in the season with regards to tropical cyclone formation, strengthening, weakening, landfall, extratropicality and dissipation. Please note that the Japan Meteorological Agency (JMA) is considered to be official for this tropical cyclone basin; Philippine Atmospheric, Geophysical and Astronomical Services Administration (PAGASA) is only responsible for Philippines warnings while the Joint Typhoon Warning Center (JTWC) releases unofficial advisories for the United States Military in the Marianas, Japan and South Korea.

All landfalls are bolded and referred to in JMA terms. The JTWC storms are referred to numerically, to avoid confusion, as the JTWC sometimes recognises a storm at a different intensity compared to the JMA. For the purposes of the timeline, all events stemming from JTWC advisories will be documented by time of issuance, rather than by the operational time of observed information (3 hours before). The timeline does not deal with the end of PAGASA-monitored storms; if the JTWC or the JMA did not monitor such a storm it should be assumed that the storm did not cause major damage or make landfall, and simply dissipated or left the area of jurisdiction of PAGASA.

For the PAGASA, only 13 systems formed or entered in their area during 2007, which only 3 of them directly made landfall over the Philippines.

== Timeline ==
=== January ===
- There was no tropical activity in the Western North Pacific basin during January.

=== February ===
- There was no tropical activity in the Western North Pacific basin during February.

=== March ===
March 31
- 12 a.m. (1200 UTC March 30) – The Japan Meteorological Agency (JMA) begins monitoring a Tropical Depression located 75 miles (125 km) south of Palikir, Pohnpei.

=== April ===
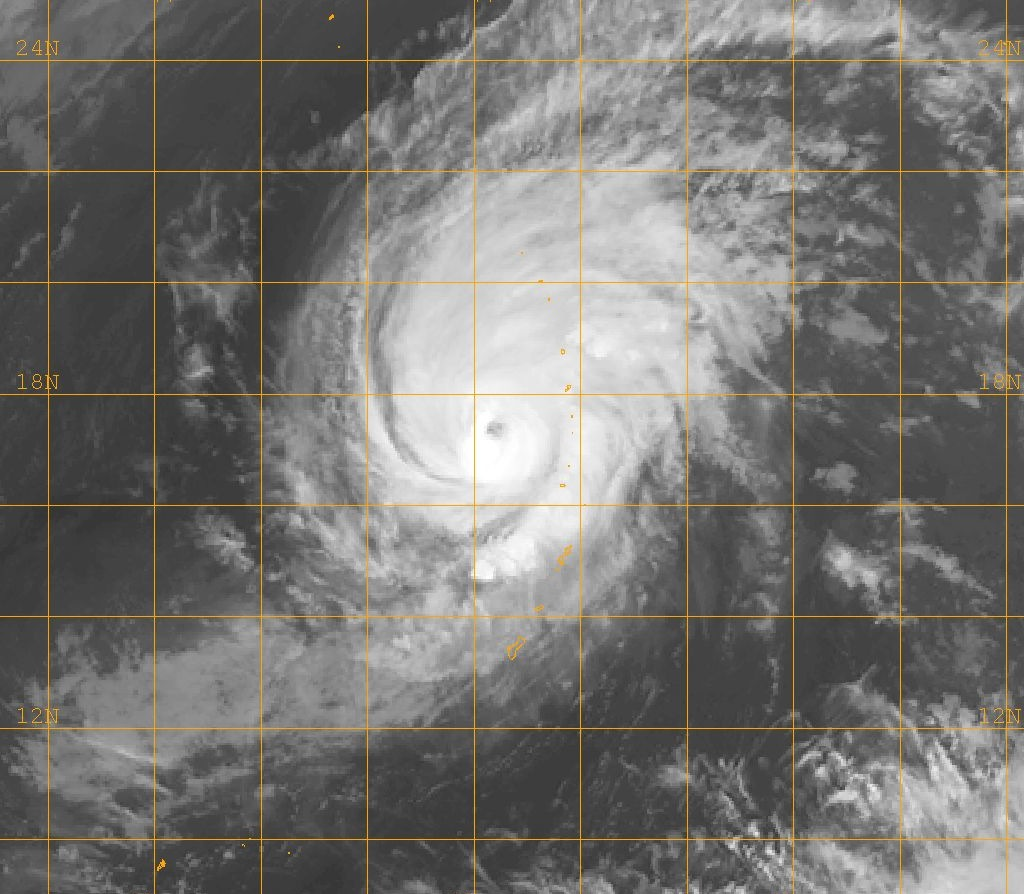
Typhoon Kong-rey at peak intensity on April 3

April 1
- 12 a.m. (1200 UTC March 31) – The Joint Typhoon Warning Center (JTWC) begins issuing advisories on Tropical Depression 01W located 240 miles (385 km) northwest of Palikir, Pohnpei.
- 6 a.m. (1800 UTC March 31) – The JTWC upgrades Tropical Depression 01W to a tropical storm.
- 12 p.m. (0000 UTC) – The JMA upgrades the tropical depression to Tropical Storm Kong-rey.
April 2
- 6 p.m. (0600 UTC) – The JTWC upgrades Tropical Storm 01W (Kong-rey) to a typhoon.
- 6 a.m. (1800 UTC April 2) – The JMA upgrades Tropical Storm Kong-rey to a severe tropical storm.
April 3
- 12 p.m. (0000 UTC) – The JMA upgrades Severe Tropical Storm Kong-rey to a typhoon.
April 4
- 12 a.m. (1200 UTC April3) – The JTWC upgrades Typhoon 01W (Kong-rey) to a Category 3 typhoon.
- 6 a.m. (1800 UTC April 3) – The JTWC downgrades Typhoon 01W (Kong-rey) to a Category 2 typhoon.
- 12 p.m. (0000 UTC) – The JTWC downgrades Typhoon 01W (Kong-rey) to a Category 1 typhoon.
April 5
- 12 a.m. (1200 UTC April 4) – The JTWC downgrades Typhoon 01W (Kong-rey) to a tropical storm.
- 6 a.m. (1800 UTC April 4) – The JMA downgrades Typhoon Kong-rey to a severe tropical storm.
- 12 p.m. (0000 UTC) – The JTWC declares Tropical Storm 01W (Kong-rey) extratropical.
- 6 p.m. (0600 UTC) – The JMA downgrades Severe Tropical Storm Kong-rey to a tropical storm.
April 6
- 12 p.m. (0000 UTC) – The JMA declares Tropical Storm Kong-rey extratropical.

=== May ===
May 16
- 3 p.m. UTC - Tropical Depression 02W forms east of Yap.

May 17
- 6 a.m. UTC - The JMA designates Tropical Depression 02W as Tropical Storm Yutu.
- 9 a.m. UTC - The JTWC upgrades Tropical Depression 02W to Tropical Storm 02W (Yutu).

May 18
- 6 a.m. UTC - The JMA upgrades Tropical Storm Yutu to Severe Tropical Storm Yutu.
- 8 a.m. UTC - PAGASA designates Severe Tropical Storm Yutu as Tropical Storm Amang.
- 3 p.m. UTC - The JTWC upgrades Tropical Storm 02W to Typhoon 02W (Yutu).
- 6 p.m. UTC - The JMA upgrades Severe Tropical Storm Yutu to Typhoon Yutu.

May 19
- 2.45 a.m. UTC - PAGASA upgrades Tropical Storm Amang to Typhoon Amang (Yutu).

May 22
- 3 a.m. UTC - The JTWC issues its final warning on Typhoon 02W (Yutu), in the process of extratropical transition.
- 9 a.m. UTC - The JMA downgrades Typhoon Yutu to a severe tropical storm.
- 3 p.m. UTC - The JMA downgrades Severe Tropical Storm Yutu to a tropical storm.

May 23
- 12 a.m. UTC - The JMA issues its final warning on the extratropical remnants of Tropical Storm Yutu.

=== June ===
- There was no tropical storm activity in the Western North Pacific basin in June.

=== July ===
July 4
- 9 a.m. UTC - Tropical Storm 03W forms just southeast of Hainan Island.
- 3 p.m. UTC - The JTWC downgrades Tropical Storm 03W to a tropical depression.
- 9 p.m. UTC - The JTWC upgrades Tropical Depression 03W back to Tropical Storm 03W.

July 5
- 12 a.m. UTC - The JMA designates Tropical Storm 03W as Tropical Storm Toraji.
- c. 12 p.m. UTC - Tropical Storm Toraji makes landfall in northeastern Vietnam.
- 3 p.m. UTC - The JTWC downgrades Tropical Storm 03W (Toraji) to a tropical depression, and issues its final advisory as it dissipates over northern Vietnam.
- 6 p.m. UTC - The JMA downgrades Tropical Storm Toraji to a tropical depression and issues its final advisory.

July 7
- 3 p.m. UTC - Tropical Depression 04W forms south-southeast of Guam.
- 9 p.m. UTC - The JTWC upgrades Tropical Depression 04W to Tropical Storm 04W.

July 8
- 6 p.m. UTC - The JMA designates Tropical Storm 04W as Tropical Storm Man-yi.

July 9
- 6 p.m. UTC - The JMA upgrades Tropical Storm Man-yi to Severe Tropical Storm Man-yi.

July 10
- 9 a.m. UTC - The JTWC upgrades Tropical Storm 04W (Man-yi) to Typhoon 04W (Man-yi).
- 6 p.m. UTC - The JMA upgrades Severe Tropical Storm Man-yi to Typhoon Man-yi.
- 9 p.m. UTC - PAGASA designates Typhoon Man-yi as Typhoon Bebeng.

July 12
- 9 p.m. UTC - The JTWC upgrades Typhoon 04W to Super Typhoon 04W (Man-yi).

July 13
- 3 a.m. UTC - The JTWC downgrades Super Typhoon 04W (Man-yi) to a typhoon.
- 9 a.m. UTC - The JTWC re-upgrades Typhoon 04W (Man-yi) to a super typhoon.
- 3 p.m. UTC - The JTWC downgrades Super Typhoon 04W (Man-yi) to a typhoon.

July 14
- c. 4 a.m. UTC - Typhoon Man-yi makes its first landfall in Kagoshima Prefecture on Kyūshū.
- c. 9 a.m. UTC - Typhoon Man-yi makes its second landfall in Kōchi Prefecture on Shikoku.
- 9 p.m. UTC - The JTWC downgrades Typhoon 04W (Man-yi) to a tropical storm.
- c. 11 p.m. UTC - Typhoon Man-yi makes its third landfall in Wakayama Prefecture on Honshū.

July 15
- 12 a.m. UTC - The JMA downgrades Typhoon Man-yi to a severe tropical storm.
- 9 a.m. UTC - The JTWC issues its final advisory on the extratropical remnants of Tropical Storm 04W (Man-yi).
- 6 p.m. UTC - The JMA downgrades Severe Tropical Storm Man-yi to a tropical storm.

July 17
- 12 a.m. UTC - The JMA issues its final advisory on the extratropical remnants of Tropical Storm Man-yi.

July 28
- 3 p.m. UTC - Tropical Depression 05W forms northeast of Saipan.
- 9 p.m. UTC - The JTWC upgrades Tropical Depression 05W to Tropical Storm 05W.

July 29
- 6 a.m. UTC - The JMA designates Tropical Storm 05W as Tropical Storm Usagi.
- 9 p.m. UTC - The JTWC upgrades Tropical Storm 05W to Typhoon 05W (Usagi).

July 30
- 12 a.m. UTC - The JMA upgrades Tropical Storm Usagi to Severe Tropical Storm Usagi.

=== August ===
August 2
- c. 8 a.m. UTC - Typhoon Usagi makes landfall near Nobeoka, Miyazaki.
- 12 p.m. UTC - The JMA downgrades Typhoon Usagi to a severe tropical storm.
- c. 5 p.m. UTC - Severe Tropical Storm Usagi makes landfall near Ube, Yamaguchi.
- 6 p.m. UTC - Tropical Depression 06W forms southeast of Huế, Vietnam.

August 3
- 12 a.m. UTC - The JMA downgrades Severe Tropical Storm Usagi to a tropical storm.

August 4
- 3 a.m. UTC - The JTWC upgrades Tropical Depression 06W to Tropical Storm 06W.
- c. 4 a.m. UTC - Tropical Storm Usagi makes landfall on the Tsugaru Peninsula in Aomori Prefecture on Honshū.
- c. 5 a.m. UTC - Tropical Storm Usagi makes a fourth landfall, near Wakinosawa, Aomori.
- 12 p.m. UTC - The JMA issues its final warning on the extratropical remnants of Tropical Storm Usagi.
- 3 p.m. UTC - The JTWC downgrades Tropical Storm 06W to a tropical depression.

August 5
- 6 a.m. UTC - The JMA designates 98W.INVEST as Tropical Storm Pabuk.
- 9 a.m. UTC - The JTWC designates Tropical Storm Pabuk as Tropical Storm 07W, northwest of Guam.
- 9 a.m. UTC - PAGASA designates Tropical Storm Pabuk as Tropical Storm Chedeng.

August 6
- 6 a.m. UTC - The JMA upgrades Tropical Storm Pabuk to Severe Tropical Storm Pabuk.

August 7
- 3 a.m. UTC - The JTWC upgrades Tropical Storm 07W to Typhoon 07W (Pabuk).
- 9 a.m. UTC - The JTWC issues its final warning on dissipating Tropical Depression 06W.
- 9 a.m. UTC - The JMA upgrades Severe Tropical Storm Pabuk to Typhoon Pabuk.
- 3 p.m. UTC - Tropical Depression 08W forms east-northeast of Manila, the Philippines.
- 3 p.m. UTC - The JTWC downgrades Typhoon 07W (Pabuk) to a tropical storm.
- 3 p.m. UTC - The JMA downgrades Typhoon Pabuk to a severe tropical storm.
- c. 4:30 p.m. UTC - Severe Tropical Storm Pabuk makes landfall on the Hengchun Peninsula in Pingtung County in southern Taiwan.
- 9 p.m. UTC - The JTWC reupgrades Tropical Storm 07W to Typhoon 07W (Pabuk).

August 8
- 12 a.m. UTC - The JMA designates Tropical Depression 08W as Tropical Storm Wutip.
- 3 a.m. UTC - The JTWC redowngrades Typhoon 07W (Pabuk) to a tropical storm.
- 3 a.m. UTC - PAGASA designates Tropical Storm Wutip as Tropical Depression Dodong.
- 9 a.m. UTC - PAGASA upgrades Tropical Depression Dodong to Tropical Storm Dodong (Wutip).
- 9 a.m. UTC - The JTWC upgrades Tropical Depression 08W to Tropical Storm 08W (Wutip).
- 6 p.m. UTC - The JMA downgrades Severe Tropical Storm Pabuk to a tropical storm.

August 9
- 6 a.m. UTC - The JMA downgrades Tropical Storm Wutip to a tropical depression and issues its last advisory.
- 9 a.m. UTC - The JTWC downgrades Tropical Storm 08W (Wutip) to a tropical depression.
- 9 a.m. UTC - The JTWC downgrades Tropical Storm 07W (Pabuk) to a tropical depression.
- 12 p.m. UTC - The JMA downgrades Tropical Storm Pabuk to a tropical depression and issues its last advisory.
- 9 p.m. UTC - The JTWC issues its last advisory on Tropical Depression 07W (Pabuk).
- 9 p.m. UTC - The JTWC issues its last advisory on Tropical Depression 08W (Wutip).

August 12
- 9 a.m. UTC - Tropical Depression 09W forms northwest of Guam.
- 3 p.m. UTC - The JTWC upgrades Tropical Depression 09W to Tropical Storm 09W.
- 6 p.m. UTC - The JMA designates Tropical Depression 09W as Tropical Storm Sepat.

August 13
- 3 a.m. UTC - PAGASA designates Tropical Storm Sepat as Tropical Storm Egay.
- 6 a.m. UTC - The JMA upgrades Tropical Storm Sepat to Severe Tropical Storm Sepat.

August 14
- 12 a.m. UTC - The JMA upgrades Severe Tropical Storm Sepat to Typhoon Sepat.
- 3 a.m. UTC - The JTWC upgrades Tropical Storm 09W to Typhoon 09W (Sepat).

August 15
- 3 a.m. UTC - The JTWC upgrades Typhoon 09W to Super Typhoon 09W (Sepat).

August 17
- 9 a.m UTC - The JTWC downgrades Super Typhoon 09W (Sepat) to a typhoon.
- c. 9 p.m. UTC - Typhoon Sepat makes landfall in Taitung County, Taiwan.

August 18
- 12 p.m. UTC - The JMA downgrades Typhoon Sepat to a severe tropical storm.
- c. 9 p.m. UTC - Severe Tropical Storm Sepat makes landfall in Fujian Province, China.

August 19
- 12 a.m. UTC - The JMA downgrades Severe Tropical Storm Sepat to a tropical storm.
- 3 a.m. UTC - The JTWC downgrades Typhoon 09W (Sepat) to a tropical storm and issues its last advisory, as the storm dissipates inland in China.

August 20
- 12 a.m. UTC - The JMA issues it last advisory on Tropical Storm Sepat.

August 28
- 9 p.m. UTC - Tropical Depression 10W forms east-northeast of Saipan.

August 29
- 6 a.m. UTC - The JMA designates Tropical Depression 10W as Tropical Storm Fitow.
- 3 a.m. UTC - The JTWC upgrades Tropical Depression 10W to Tropical Storm 10W.
- 12 p.m. UTC - The JMA upgrades Tropical Storm Fitow to Severe Tropical Storm Fitow.
- 9 p.m. UTC - The JTWC upgrades Tropical Storm 10W to Typhoon 10W (Fitow).

August 30
- 12 p.m. UTC - The JMA upgrades Severe Tropical Storm Fitow to Typhoon Fitow.

=== September ===
September 3
- 12 p.m. UTC - The JMA downgrades Typhoon Fitow to a severe tropical storm.

September 5
- 12 a.m. UTC - The JMA reupgrades Severe Tropical Storm Fitow to Typhoon Fitow.

September 6
- c. 3 p.m. UTC - Typhoon Fitow makes its first landfall at Izu Peninsula in Shizuoka Prefecture on Honshū.

September 7
- 12 a.m. UTC - The JMA downgrades Typhoon Fitow to a severe tropical storm.
- 3 a.m. UTC - The JTWC downgrades Typhoon 10W (Fitow) to a tropical storm.
- 9 a.m. UTC - The JTWC issues its final warning on Tropical Storm 10W (Fitow), in the process of extratropical transition.
- 9 a.m. UTC - Tropical Depression 11W forms far east of Iōtō.
- 12 p.m. UTC - The JMA designates Tropical Depression 11W as Tropical Storm Danas.
- 3 p.m. UTC - The JMA downgrades Severe Tropical Storm Fitow to a tropical storm.
- 3 p.m. UTC - The JTWC upgrades Tropical Depression 11W to Tropical Storm 11W.
- c. 4 p.m. UTC - Tropical Storm Fitow makes its second landfall on the Oshima Peninsula, near Hakodate, Hokkaidō.
- c. 7 p.m. UTC - Tropical Storm Fitow makes its third landfall near Abuta, Hokkaidō.
- c. 10 p.m. UTC - Tropical Storm Fitow makes its final landfall near Atsuta, Hokkaidō.

September 8
- 6 a.m. UTC - The JMA issues its final warning on the extratropical remnants of Tropical Storm Fitow.

September 9
- 6 p.m. UTC - The JMA upgrades Tropical Storm Danas to Severe Tropical Storm Danas.

September 11
- 3 a.m. UTC - The JTWC issues its final warning on Tropical Storm 11W (Danas), in the process of extratropical transition.
- 12 p.m. UTC - The JMA downgrades Severe Tropical Storm Danas to a tropical storm.
- 6 p.m. UTC - The JMA issues its final warning on the extratropical remnants of Tropical Storm Danas.

September 12
- 6 p.m. UTC - Tropical Depression 12W forms southwest of Naha, Okinawa.

September 13
- 3:45 a.m. UTC - PAGASA designates Tropical Depression 12W as Tropical Depression Falcon.
- 6 a.m. UTC - The JMA designates Tropical Depression 12W as Tropical Storm Nari.
- 9 a.m. UTC - The JTWC upgrades Tropical Depression 12W to Tropical Storm 12W (Nari).
- 3 p.m. UTC - PAGASA upgrades Tropical Depression Falcon to Tropical Storm Falcon (Nari).
- 6 p.m. UTC - The JMA upgrades Tropical Storm Nari to Severe Tropical Storm Nari.
- 9 p.m. UTC - The JTWC upgrades Tropical Storm 12W (Nari) to Typhoon 12W (Nari).

September 14
- 12 a.m. UTC - The JMA upgrades Severe Tropical Storm Nari to Typhoon Nari.
- 2:45 a.m. UTC - PAGASA upgrades Tropical Storm Falcon (Nari) to Typhoon Falcon (Nari).
- c. 12 p.m. UTC - Typhoon Nari grazes Kumejima, due west of Okinawa Island.

September 15
- 9 a.m. UTC - Tropical Depression 13W forms southeast of Naha, Okinawa.
- 9 a.m. UTC - PAGASA designates Tropical Depression 13W as Tropical Depression Goring.

September 16
- 12 a.m. UTC - The JMA designates Tropical Depression 13W as Tropical Storm Wipha.
- 3 a.m. UTC - The JTWC upgrades Tropical Depression 13W to Tropical Storm 13W (Wipha).
- 3 a.m. UTC - PAGASA upgrades Tropical Depression Goring to Tropical Storm Goring (Wipha).
- c. 4:30 a.m. UTC - Typhoon Nari grazes Jeju-do, just southwest of mainland South Korea.
- c. 8:30 a.m. UTC - Typhoon Nari makes landfall in southeastern Jeollanam province, on the Korean Peninsula.
- 12 p.m. UTC - The JMA downgrades Typhoon Nari to a severe tropical storm.
- 12 p.m. UTC - The JMA upgrades Tropical Storm Wipha to Severe Tropical Storm Wipha.
- 3 p.m. UTC - The JMA downgrades Severe Tropical Storm Nari to a tropical storm.
- 3 p.m. UTC - The JTWC downgrades Typhoon 12W (Nari), in the process of extratropical transition, to a tropical storm, and issues its final warning.
- 3 p.m. UTC - The JTWC upgrades Tropical Storm 13W to Typhoon 13W (Wipha).
- 3 p.m. UTC - PAGASA upgrades Tropical Storm Goring to Severe Tropical Storm Goring (Wipha).
- c. 10 p.m. UTC - Tropical Storm Nari passes over Ulleungdo, due east of Seoul in the Sea of Japan.

September 17
- 12 a.m. UTC - The JMA issues its final warning on the extratropical remnants of Tropical Storm Nari.
- 3 a.m. UTC - The JMA upgrades Severe Tropical Storm Wipha to Typhoon Wipha.
- 3 a.m. UTC - PAGASA upgrades Severe Tropical Storm Goring to Typhoon Goring (Wipha).
- 9 p.m. UTC - The JTWC upgrades Typhoon 13W to Super Typhoon 13W (Wipha).
- c. 10 p.m. - Typhoon Wipha passes over Iriomote, due east of Hualien City.

September 18
- 3 p.m. UTC - The JTWC downgrades Super Typhoon 13W (Wipha) to a typhoon.
- c. 6 p.m. UTC - Typhoon Wipha makes landfall over Fuding, near the Fujian-Zhejiang provincial border.

September 19
- 3 a.m. UTC - The JMA downgrades Typhoon Wipha to a severe tropical storm.
- 9 a.m. UTC - The JMA downgrades Severe Tropical Storm Wipha to a tropical storm.
- 9 a.m. UTC - The JTWC downgrades Typhoon 13W (Wipha), in the process of extratropical transition, to a tropical storm, and issues its final warning.
- 12 p.m. UTC - The JMA downgrades Tropical Storm Wipha to a tropical depression, and issues its final warning.

September 20
- 3 p.m. UTC - Tropical Depression 14W forms west of Guam.

September 21
- 3 p.m. UTC - The JTWC issues its final warning on Tropical Depression 14W, dissipating over water.

September 23
- 3 a.m. UTC - Tropical Depression 15W forms south-southeast of Hong Kong.
- 12 p.m. UTC - The JMA designates Tropical Depression 15W as Tropical Storm Francisco.
- 3 p.m. UTC - The JTWC upgrades Tropical Depression 15W to Tropical Storm 15W (Francisco).

September 24
- 3 a.m. UTC - Tropical Storm Francisco makes landfall near Wenchang on Hainan Island.
- 6 p.m. UTC - The JTWC downgrades Tropical Storm 15W (Francisco) to a tropical depression.

September 25
- 3 a.m. UTC - The JTWC issues its final warning on Tropical Depression 15W (Francisco), dissipating over water.
- 6 a.m. UTC - The JMA downgrades Tropical Storm Francisco to a tropical depression, and issues its final warning.

September 27
- 9 a.m. UTC - PAGASA designates 98W.INVEST, east of the Philippines, as Tropical Depression Hanna.

September 28
- 9 a.m. UTC - PAGASA upgrades Tropical Depression Hanna to Tropical Storm Hanna.

September 29
- c. 1 a.m. UTC - Tropical Storm Hanna makes landfall in Dilasag, Aurora on Luzon.
- 3 a.m. UTC - PAGASA downgrades Tropical Storm Hanna to a tropical depression.

September 30
- 12 a.m. - The JMA designates 90W.INVEST, now the same system as Tropical Depression Hanna, as Tropical Storm Lekima.
- 3 a.m. UTC - The JTWC designates Tropical Storm Lekima as Tropical Depression 16W, east-northeast of Nha Trang, Vietnam.
- 9 a.m. UTC - The JTWC upgrades Tropical Depression 16W to Tropical Storm 16W (Lekima).
- 9 p.m. UTC - The JMA upgrades Tropical Storm Lekima to Severe Tropical Storm Lekima.

=== October ===
October 1
- 4 a.m. UTC - PAGASA designates 91W.INVEST as Tropical Depression Ineng.
- 3 p.m. UTC - The JTWC designates Tropical Depression Ineng as Tropical Depression 17W, far east-northeast of Manila, the Philippines.
- 3 p.m. UTC - PAGASA upgrades Tropical Depression Ineng to Tropical Storm Ineng.
- 6 p.m. UTC - The JTWC upgrades Tropical Depression 17W to Tropical Storm 17W.

October 2
- 12 a.m. UTC - The JMA designates Tropical Storm 17W (Ineng) as Tropical Storm Krosa.
- 9 a.m. UTC - The JTWC upgrades Tropical Storm 16W to Typhoon 16W (Lekima).
- 3 p.m. UTC - The JTWC upgrades Tropical Storm 17W to Typhoon 17W (Krosa).
- 6 p.m. UTC - The JMA upgrades Tropical Storm Krosa to Severe Tropical Storm Krosa.

October 3
- 3 a.m. UTC - PAGASA upgrades Tropical Storm Ineng to Typhoon Ineng (Krosa).
- 6 a.m. UTC - The JMA upgrades Severe Tropical Storm Krosa to Typhoon Krosa.
- c. 12 p.m. UTC - Severe Tropical Storm Lekima makes landfall on the North Central Coast of Vietnam.
- c. 6 p.m. UTC - The JMA downgrades Severe Tropical Storm Lekima to a tropical storm.
- 9 p.m. UTC - The JTWC downgrades Typhoon 16W (Lekima) to a tropical storm and issues its final warning as the storm dissipates inland in Indochina.

October 4
- 6 a.m. UTC - The JMA downgrades Tropical Storm Lekima to a tropical depression, and issues its final warning.

October 5
- 3 a.m. UTC - The JTWC upgrades Typhoon 17W to Super Typhoon 17W (Krosa).

October 6
- 12 a.m. UTC - The JMA designates 93W.INVEST as Tropical Storm Haiyan.
- 3 a.m. UTC - The JTWC downgrades Super Typhoon 17W (Krosa) to a typhoon.
- c. 3 a.m. UTC - Typhoon Krosa grazes Yonaguni, due east of Hualien.
- 6 a.m. UTC - The JMA designates 92W.INVEST as Tropical Storm Podul.
- c. 8 a.m. UTC - Typhoon Krosa makes landfall near Su-ao, Yilan in northeastern Taiwan.
- c. 3 p.m. UTC - Typhoon Krosa makes a second landfall near Gongliao, Taipei, also in northeastern Taiwan.
- 6 p.m. UTC - The JMA downgrades Tropical Storm Haiyan to a tropical depression and issues its final advisory.

October 7
- 12 a.m. UTC - The JMA issues its final advisory on the extratropical remnants of Tropical Storm Podul.
- 12 a.m. UTC - The JMA downgrades Typhoon Krosa to a severe tropical storm.
- c. 9 a.m. UTC - Severe Tropical Storm Krosa makes landfall over Fuding, near the Fujian-Zhejiang provincial border.
- 9 a.m. UTC - The JTWC downgrades Typhoon 17W (Krosa) to a tropical storm.

October 8
- 12 a.m. UTC - The JMA downgrades Severe Tropical Storm Krosa to a tropical storm.
- 12 p.m. UTC - The JMA issues its final advisory on the remnants of Tropical Storm Krosa, dissipating just off the coast of China.
- 9 p.m. UTC - The JTWC downgrades Tropical Storm 17W (Krosa) to a tropical depression and issues its final advisory.

October 12
- 6 a.m. UTC - The JMA designates 97W.INVEST as Tropical Storm Lingling.
- 9 a.m. UTC - The JTWC designates Tropical Storm Lingling as Tropical Depression 18W, far west-southwest of Midway Atoll.
- 3 p.m. UTC - The JTWC upgrades Tropical Depression 18W to Tropical Storm 18W (Lingling).

October 13
- 9 p.m. UTC - The JTWC downgrades Tropical Storm 18W (Lingling) to a tropical depression and issues its final advisory.

October 15
- 6 a.m. UTC - The JMA issues its final advisory on the extratropical remnants of Tropical Storm Lingling.

October 19
- 3 a.m. UTC - Tropical Depression 19W forms north-northwest of Saipan.
- 6 a.m. UTC - The JMA designates Tropical Depression 19W as Tropical Storm Kajiki.
- 9 a.m. UTC - The JTWC upgrades Tropical Depression 19W to Tropical Storm 19W (Kajiki).
- 12 p.m. UTC - The JMA upgrades Tropical Storm Kajiki to Severe Tropical Storm Kajiki.
- 9 p.m. UTC - The JTWC upgrades Tropical Storm 19W to Typhoon 19W (Kajiki).

October 20
- 12 a.m. UTC - The JMA upgrades Severe Tropical Storm Kajiki to Typhoon Kajiki.

October 21
- 3 p.m. UTC - The JTWC issues its final advisory on Typhoon 19W (Kajiki) as it completes extratropical transition.
- 6 p.m. UTC - The JMA downgrades Typhoon Kajiki to a severe tropical storm.

October 22
- 6 a.m. UTC - The JMA issues its final advisory on the extratropical remnants of Severe Tropical Storm Kajiki.

October 26
- 12 a.m. UTC - The JMA designates 94W.INVEST as Tropical Storm Faxai.
- 2 a.m. UTC - PAGASA designates Tropical Storm Faxai as Tropical Depression Juaning.
- 3 a.m. UTC - The JTWC designates Tropical Storm Faxai as Tropical Depression 20W, southeast of Naha, Okinawa.
- 3 p.m. UTC - The JTWC declares Tropical Depression 20W (Faxai) extratropical and discontinues advisories.
- 3 p.m. UTC - PAGASA upgrades Tropical Depression Juaning to Tropical Storm Juaning (Faxai).
- 9 p.m. UTC - The JTWC resumes advisories on Faxai, now declaring it Tropical Storm 20W (Faxai).

October 27
- 12 a.m. UTC - The JMA upgrades Tropical Storm Faxai to Severe Tropical Storm Faxai.
- 3 a.m. UTC - The JTWC issues its last advisory on Tropical Storm 20W (Faxai), now completely extratropical.
- 6 p.m. UTC - The JMA issues its last advisory on the extratropical remnants of Severe Tropical Storm Faxai.

=== November ===
November 3
- 9 a.m. UTC - Tropical Depression 21W forms far east-northeast of Manila, the Philippines.
- 9 a.m. UTC - PAGASA designates Tropical Depression 21W as Tropical Depression Kabayan.
- 12 p.m. UTC - The JMA designates Tropical Depression 21W as Tropical Storm Peipah.
- 3 p.m. UTC - PAGASA upgrades Tropical Depression Kabayan to Tropical Storm Kabayan (Peipah).
- 3 p.m. UTC - The JTWC upgrades Tropical Depression 21W to Tropical Storm 21W (Peipah).

November 4
- 12 a.m. UTC - The JMA upgrades Tropical Storm Peipah to Severe Tropical Storm Peipah.
- c. 1 p.m. UTC - Severe Tropical Storm Peipah makes landfall in Palanan, Isabela.
- 3 p.m. UTC - The JTWC upgrades Tropical Storm 21W to Typhoon 21W (Peipah).

November 5
- 3 a.m. UTC - The JTWC downgrades Typhoon 21W (Peipah) to a tropical storm.
- 9 p.m. UTC - The JTWC upgrades Tropical Storm 21W to Typhoon 21W (Peipah).

November 6
- 3 a.m. UTC - The JMA upgrades Severe Tropical Storm Peipah to Typhoon Peipah.
- 9 a.m. UTC - PAGASA upgrades Tropical Storm Kabayan to Typhoon Kabayan (Peipah).

November 7
- 6 a.m. UTC - The JMA downgrades Typhoon Peipah to a severe tropical storm.
- 3 p.m. UTC - The JTWC downgrades Typhoon 21W (Peipah) to a tropical storm.
- 3 p.m. UTC - The JMA downgrades Severe Tropical Storm Peipah to a tropical storm.

November 8
- 3 a.m. UTC - The JTWC downgrades Tropical Storm 21W (Peipah) to a tropical depression.

November 9
- 12 a.m. UTC - The JMA downgrades Tropical Storm Peipah to a tropical depression and issues its final advisory.
- 3 p.m. UTC - The JTWC issues its final advisory on Tropical Depression 21W (Peipah), dissipating off the coast of Vietnam.

November 11
- 3 p.m. UTC - Tropical Depression 22W forms south-southwest of Iōtō.

November 12
- 12 a.m. UTC - The JMA designates Tropical Depression 22W as Tropical Storm Tapah.
- 3 a.m. UTC - The JTWC upgrades Tropical Depression 22W to Tropical Storm 22W (Tapah).
- 9 p.m. UTC - The JTWC downgrades Tropical Storm 22W (Tapah) to a tropical depression and issues its final advisory.

November 13
- 12 a.m. UTC - The JMA downgrades Tropical Storm Tapah to a tropical depression and issues its final advisory.

November 18
- 9 p.m. UTC - Tropical Depression 23W forms just east of northern Mindanao.

November 19
- 5:45 a.m. UTC - PAGASA designates Tropical Depression 23W as Tropical Depression Lando.
- 9 a.m. UTC - PAGASA upgrades Tropical Depression Lando to Tropical Storm Lando.
- 9 p.m. UTC - The JTWC upgrades Tropical Depression 23W to Tropical Storm 23W.

November 20
- 9 a.m. UTC - Tropical Depression 24W forms north-northwest of Yap.
- 12 p.m. UTC - The JMA designates Tropical Depression 24W as Tropical Storm Mitag.
- 6 p.m. UTC - The JMA designates Tropical Storm 23W as Tropical Storm Hagibis.
- 8 p.m. UTC - PAGASA designates Tropical Storm Mitag as Tropical Storm Mina.
- 9 p.m. UTC - The JTWC upgrades Tropical Depression 24W to Tropical Storm 24W (Mitag).

November 21
- 6 a.m. UTC - The JMA upgrades Tropical Storm Hagibis to Severe Tropical Storm Hagibis.
- 12 p.m. UTC - The JMA upgrades Tropical Storm Mitag to Severe Tropical Storm Mitag.
- 9 p.m. UTC - The JTWC upgrades Tropical Storm 23W to Typhoon 23W (Hagibis).
- 9 p.m. UTC - The JTWC upgrades Tropical Storm 24W to Typhoon 24W (Mitag).

November 22
- 12 a.m. UTC - The JMA upgrades Severe Tropical Storm Hagibis to Typhoon Hagibis.
- 12 a.m. UTC - The JMA upgrades Severe Tropical Storm Mitag to Typhoon Mitag.
- 3 a.m. UTC - PAGASA upgrades Tropical Storm Mina to Typhoon Mina (Mitag).

November 23
- 6 p.m. UTC - The JMA downgrades Typhoon Hagibis to a severe tropical storm.
- 9 p.m. UTC - The JTWC downgrades Typhoon 23W (Hagibis) to a tropical storm.

November 25
- c. 2 p.m. UTC - Severe Tropical Storm Mitag makes landfall near Palanan, Isabela.

November 26
- 3 a.m. UTC - The JTWC downgrades Tropical Storm 23W (Hagibis) to a tropical depression.
- 6 a.m. UTC - The JMA downgrades Severe Tropical Storm Hagibis to a tropical storm.
- 6 a.m. UTC - The JMA downgrades Typhoon Mitag to a severe tropical storm.
- 9 a.m. UTC - PAGASA downgrades Typhoon Mina (Mitag) to a tropical storm.
- 9 a.m. UTC - Tropical Depression 25W forms south-southeast of Naha, Okinawa.
- 9 p.m. UTC - The JTWC downgrades Typhoon 24W (Mitag) to a tropical storm.

November 27
- 3 a.m. UTC - The JTWC issues its final advisory on Tropical Depression 23W (Hagibis) as it begins to dissipate.
- c. 8 a.m. UTC - Tropical Storm Hagibis makes landfall near Sablayan, Occidental Mindoro.
- c. 2 p.m. UTC - Tropical Storm Hagibis crosses several islands in Romblon province.
- 3 p.m. UTC - PAGASA downgrades Tropical Storm Mina (Mitag) to a tropical depression.
- 6 p.m. UTC - The JMA downgrades Tropical Storm Mitag to a tropical depression and issues its final advisory.
- c. 8 p.m. UTC - Tropical Storm Hagibis makes landfall near San Francisco, Quezon.
- 9 p.m. UTC - The JTWC downgrades Tropical Storm 24W (Mitag) to a tropical depression and issues its final advisory, noting that the system is now extratropical.
- 9 p.m. UTC - The JTWC issues its final advisory on Tropical Depression 25W as it completes extratropical transition.

November 28
- c. 12 a.m. UTC - Tropical Storm Hagibis makes its final landfall near Pasacao, Camarines Sur.
- 3 a.m. UTC - PAGASA issues its final advisory on Tropical Depression Mina (Mitag).
- 3 a.m. UTC - The JMA downgrades Tropical Storm Hagibis to a tropical depression and issues its final advisory.
- 9 a.m. UTC - PAGASA downgrades Tropical Depression Lando (Hagibis) to a low pressure area and issues its final advisory.
- 3 p.m. UTC - Tropical Depression 26W forms west of Iōtō.
- 9 p.m. UTC - The JTWC issues its final advisory on Tropical Depression 26W as it completes extratropical transition.

=== December ===
- There was no tropical activity in the Western North Pacific basin during December.

== See also ==
- 2007 Pacific typhoon season
- Pacific typhoon season
- Timeline of the 2007 Atlantic hurricane season
- Timeline of the 2007 Pacific hurricane season
- Timeline of the 2007 North Indian Ocean cyclone season
- Timeline of the 2007–08 South-West Indian Ocean cyclone season
- Timeline of the 2007–08 South Pacific cyclone season
- Timeline of the 2007–08 Australian region cyclone season
