= List of storms named Kong-rey =

The name Kong-rey (Khmer: កង្រី, [kɑŋ.ˈrəj]) has been used for five tropical cyclones in the western North Pacific Ocean. The name was contributed by Cambodia and refers to a girl from a Khmer legend, as well as a mountain named after that girl.

- Typhoon Kong-rey (2001) (T0106, 09W) – not a threat to land.
- Typhoon Kong-rey (2007) (T0701, 01W) – affected the Mariana Islands though not a threat to mainland.
- Severe Tropical Storm Kong-rey (2013) (T1315, 14W, Nando) – passed close to Taiwan and affected Japan.
- Typhoon Kong-rey (2018) (T1825, 30W, Queenie) – a Category 5 super typhoon that affected Japan and South Korea.
- Typhoon Kong-rey (2024) (T2421, 23W, Leon) – a large Category 5 super typhoon that became the latest typhoon to make landfall in Taiwan.

The name Kong-rey was retired following the 2024 Pacific typhoon season and was replaced with Koki (Khmer: គគីរ, [kɔ.ˈkiː]), which refers to a type of tree (Hopea odorata) in Khmer.
