= Cyclone Daman =

Category 4 South Pacific cyclone in 2007

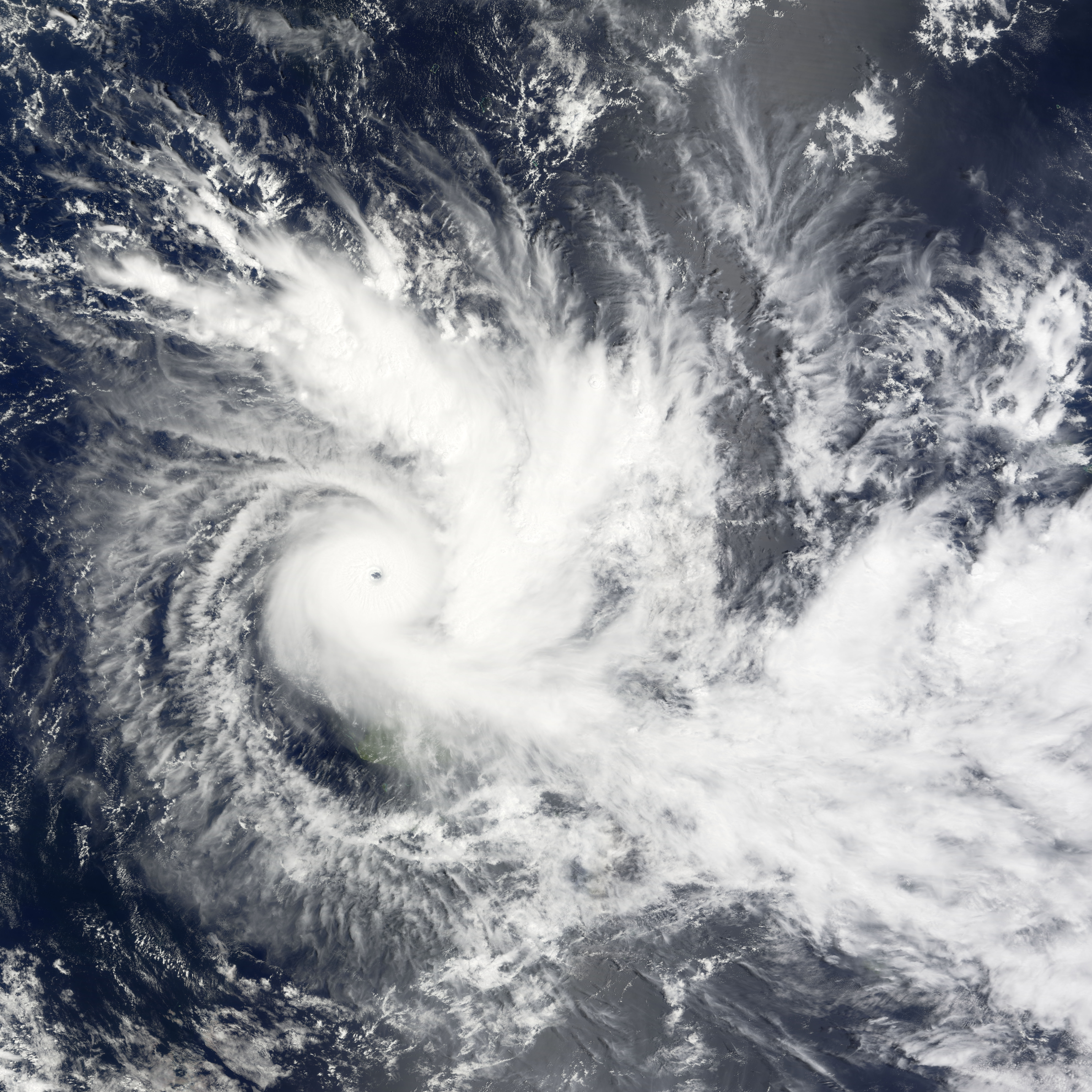
- Severe Tropical Cyclone Daman near peak intensity

Meteorological history
- Formed: December 2, 2007
- Dissipated: December 10, 2007

Category 4 severe tropical cyclone
- 10-minute sustained (FMS)
- Highest winds: 185 km/h (115 mph)
- Lowest pressure: 925 hPa (mbar); 27.32 inHg

Category 3-equivalent tropical cyclone
- 1-minute sustained (SSHWS/JTWC)
- Highest winds: 205 km/h (125 mph)
- Lowest pressure: 941 hPa (mbar); 27.79 inHg

Overall effects
- Fatalities: None
- Damage: $330,000 (2007 USD)
- Areas affected: Fiji
- IBTrACS
- Part of the 2007–08 South Pacific cyclone season

Severe Tropical Cyclone Daman was the strongest cyclone of the 2007–08 South Pacific cyclone season. Cyclone Daman was the fourth tropical depression and the first severe tropical cyclone to form east of longitude 180° during the 2007–08 South Pacific cyclone season. Due to the severity of the storm, the name Daman was retired and replaced with Denia.

On December 3, the Regional Specialized Meteorological Centre (RSMC) in Nadi, Fiji, upgraded a tropical disturbance, located to the west of the Solomon Islands, to Tropical Depression 04F. On December 5, as the depression moved towards the west into the Fijian archipelago, both the Joint Typhoon Warning Center (JTWC) and RSMC Nadi upgraded it to Cyclone Daman. On December 7 the cyclone reached its peak intensity with winds of 185 km/h, (115 mph 10-minute sustained) which made Daman a Category 4 cyclone on the Australian Tropical Cyclone Intensity Scale. Later that day Daman also reached its peak intensity by 1-minute means with winds of 205 km/h (125 mph) which made it a category 3 tropical cyclone on the Saffir–Simpson scale. Early on December 8, Cyclone Daman brushed by the Fijian island of Cikobia-i-Lau, causing damage to housing, crops and vegetation. Daman then weakened the next day into a tropical depression and dissipated on December 10.

== Meteorological history ==
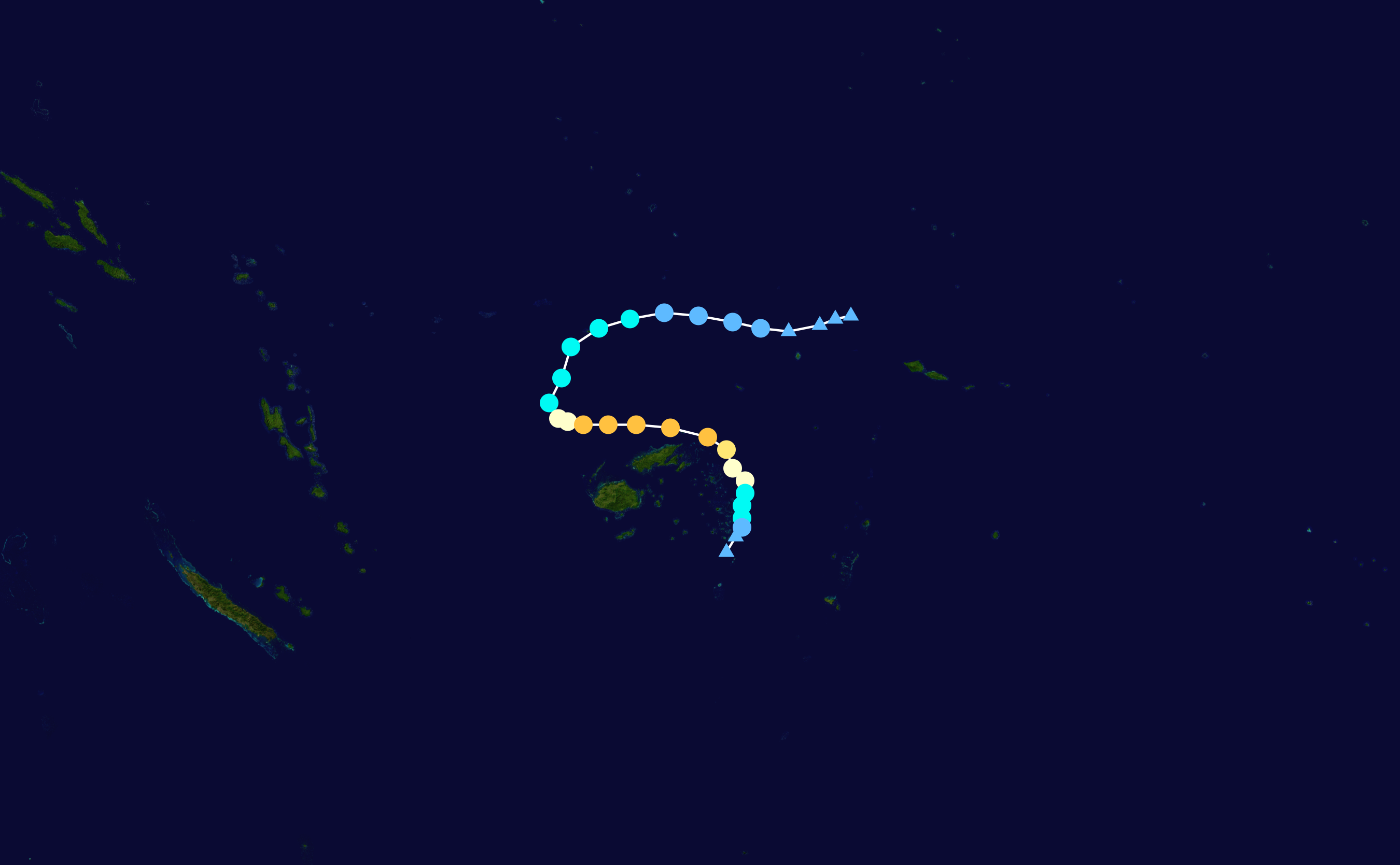
Map plotting the storm's track and intensity, according to the Saffir–Simpson scale Map key Saffir–Simpson scale Tropical depression (≤38 mph, ≤62 km/h) Tropical storm (39–73 mph, 63–118 km/h) Category 1 (74–95 mph, 119–153 km/h) Category 2 (96–110 mph, 154–177 km/h) Category 3 (111–129 mph, 178–208 km/h) Category 4 (130–156 mph, 209–251 km/h) Category 5 (≥157 mph, ≥252 km/h) Unknown Storm type Tropical cyclone Subtropical cyclone Extratropical cyclone, remnant low, tropical disturbance, or monsoon depression

On December 2, the United States Joint Typhoon Warning Center started to monitor a tropical disturbance that had developed within the South Pacific Convergence Zone, about 295 km (185 mi) to the northwest of Apia, Samoa.

During December 3, the Fiji Meteorological Service and the United States Joint Typhoon Warning Center reported that an area of atmospheric convection, had persisted about 1,000 km (620 mi) to the north-west of Suva the capital of Fiji. At this time the system was located within an area of minimal vertical wind shear and warm sea surface temperatures. Over the next two days, the depression moved towards the west, conditions surrounding the depression barely changed and as a result the depression steadily intensified. Early on December 5, the system had convective bands spiraling into and wrapping tightly around the low level circulation center. As a result of this, the JTWC started advisories on Tropical Cyclone 05P, with winds equivalent to a tropical storm. At 0200 UTC, RSMC Nadi reported that the tropical depression had intensified into a category one tropical cyclone on the Australian tropical cyclone intensity scale and named it as Daman. During that day Daman passed over Rotuma island while gradually intensifying further.

At 0600 UTC, on December 6, the JTWC reported that Daman had intensified into a category one tropical cyclone on the Saffir–Simpson hurricane scale. Shortly after this, the cyclone made an abrupt turn and started to move towards the east instead of moving towards the south. Later that day at 1200 UTC, RSMC Nadi reported that Daman had intensified into a category three severe tropical cyclone as it was now sporting a cloud filled eye. The cyclone continued to intensify over the next 12 hours becoming a category four severe tropical cyclone at 0000 UTC on December 7. At that time RSMC Nadi forecasted, that there was a possibility that Daman could become a category five severe tropical cyclone, with windspeeds of 215 km/h, (130 mph), within 12 hours. However six hours later as the general organization of the eye had weakened, RSMC Nadi reported that the cyclone had peaked as a category four severe tropical cyclone with ten-minute winds of 195 km/h, (120 mph) and a peak pressure of 925 hPa (27.3 inHg). The JTWC also reported that Cyclone Daman had peaked with one-minute winds of 195 km/h, (120 mph). In their post storm analysis, both RSMC Nadi and the JTWC revised their estimated peak windspeeds, with RSMC Nadi lowering their estimated windspeeds to 185 km/h, (115 mph), while the JTWC elevated their estimates to 205 km/h, (125 mph). As the Cyclone peaked in intensity, it started to accelerate towards the southeast and passed over or close to Thikombia island, before becoming under the influence of a mid-level ridge of high pressure. As it came under the influence of the mid-level ridge of high pressure, Daman turned once more and started to move slowly towards the southeast, into an area of strengthening vertical windshear and cooler sea surface temperatures. As a result, Daman rapidly weakened during December 8, before both the next day as the system moved through the Lau Islands, both the JTWC and RSMC Nadi reported that it had weakened into a tropical depression. The final advisories on the system were issued the next day as Daman merged with a frontal system.

== Effects ==
Severe Tropical Cyclone Daman impacted Fiji and its dependency of Rotuma between December 5 – 9, where it caused about F$500,000 (2007) ($330,000 US$2007) worth of damage. On December 5, the FMS issued a gale warning for Rotuma and warned that Daman was expected to pass near or over the Fijian dependency. The system subsequently passed over the island later that day, where it caused no serious damage, but pushed the cruise ship MV Lycianda on to a reef which suffered some damage to its rudders and propellers.

Early on December 5, RSMC Nadi started to issue special weather bulletins on Cyclone Daman as a tropical cyclone gale warning had been issued for the Fijian dependency of Rotuma. Later that morning, as the Cyclone moved over Rotuma, RSMC Nadi issued a tropical cyclone alert for the rest of Fiji. During that afternoon, RSMC Nadi canceled the tropical cyclone gale warning for Rotuma and then upgraded the cyclone alerts for the northwest of Fiji to a tropical cyclone gale warning later that day. Early the next day, as the storm was intensifying, they upgraded the gale warnings for parts of northwest of Fiji to storm warnings while expanding the warnings to the western and central sides of Viti Levu and the western side of Vanua Levu. During that afternoon RSMC Nadi further revised the warnings as Cyclone Daman had become a severe tropical cyclone.

A hurricane warning was then declared at this time for the Yasawa Group, northern Viti Levu, Vanua Levu as well as smaller islands located nearby. Later that day, as Daman reached its peak, all areas of Fiji were under a gale warning. Early on December 7 RSMC Nadi canceled some of the warnings for Fiji, including the gale force warning for southwestern Viti Levu, and then later that day downgraded all the warnings that were still in effect for Fiji to gale force as Daman was weakening.

Cyclone Daman brought heavy rain which caused floods and landslides within Fiji's northern division. This led to several international and domestic flights being canceled on December 7. The Fijian island of Cikobia received a direct hit whilst Daman passed directly over Rotuma. The total cost to Fiji from Cyclone Daman was F$500,000 (2007) ($330,000 US$2007) with no damage being reported in Tonga from the storm.

Daman did most of its damages on Cikobia island, which has a population of around 120. Damage on Cikobia included extensive damages to houses, school buildings, crops, fruitbearing trees and foliage. Water pipes were damaged by fallen trees as a result of high winds from the storm. Despite initial fears of there being some fatalities on Cikobia, no loss of life was recorded due to the storm. This was because the islands 120 residents had evacuated to caves on Cikobia. The Fijian Dependency of Rotuma experienced a significant amount of rainfall from December 5 until December 7, when Cyclone Daman was located near Rotuma.

Because there were no deaths and only 65 people had been directly affected by Cyclone Daman, the Fijian government, with the help of the Red Cross, decided not to request any International Aid or any external assistance. The Fijian Government, on January 15, 2008, allocated $530,000 2008 FJD for the relief and rehabilitation programme of Cikobia. By August 2008, all work rebuilding Cikobia after Cyclone Daman had been completed.

Due to the impact of this system, the name Daman was subsequently retired, from the list of names for the region by the World Meteorological Organization.

== See also ==
- List of Southern Hemisphere tropical cyclone seasons
- 2007–08 South Pacific cyclone season
- Other storms named Daman
- Cyclone Guba
- Timeline of the 2007–08 South Pacific cyclone season
