= Tropical cyclones in 2008 =

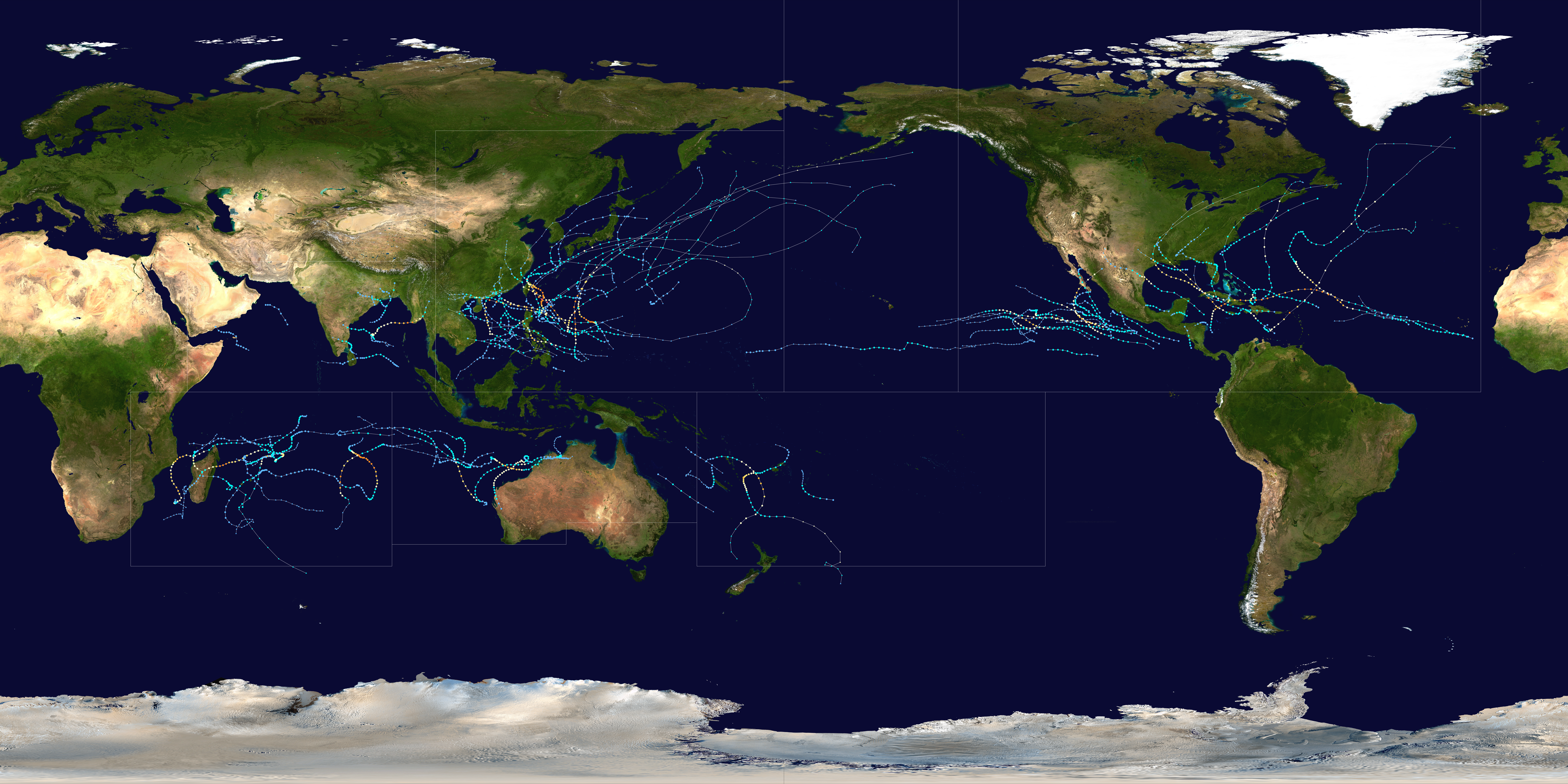
- Year summary map

Year boundaries
- First system: 07
- Formed: January 6, 2008
- Last system: 05U
- Dissipated: December 28, 2008

Strongest system
- Name: Jangmi
- Lowest pressure: 905 mbar (hPa); 26.72 inHg

Longest lasting system
- Name: Hondo
- Duration: 28 days

Year statistics
- Total systems: 124
- Named systems: 83
- Total fatalities: 142,091
- Total damage: > $70.3 billion (2008 USD)
Related articles
- 2008 Atlantic hurricane season
- 2008 Pacific hurricane season
- 2008 Pacific typhoon season
- 2008 North Indian Ocean cyclone season
- 2007–08 South-West Indian Ocean cyclone season
- 2008–09 South-West Indian Ocean cyclone season
- 2007–08 Australian region cyclone season
- 2008–09 Australian region cyclone season
- 2007–08 South Pacific cyclone season
- 2008–09 South Pacific cyclone season

Throughout 2008, 124 tropical cyclones have formed in bodies of water known as tropical cyclone basins. Of these, 83 have been named, by various weather agencies when they attained maximum sustained winds of 35 knots (65 km/h; 40 mph). The strongest storm of the year was Typhoon Jangmi in the Western Pacific Ocean. The deadliest storm of the year was Cyclone Nargis, which caused devastating and castatrophic destruction in Myanmar with 138,373 fatalities. The costliest storm of the year was Hurricane Ike, which wreaked havoc thorough Cuba and Texas, with $38 billion (2008 USD) in damage. Throughout the year, 24 Category 3 tropical cyclones formed, including one Category 5 tropical cyclone in the year. The accumulated cyclone energy (ACE) index for the 2008 (seven basins combined), as calculated by Colorado State University was 613.9 units.

Tropical cyclones are primarily monitored by a group of ten warning centres, which have been designated as a Regional Specialized Meteorological Center (RSMC) or a Tropical Cyclone Warning Center (TCWC) by the World Meteorological Organization. These are the United States National Hurricane Center (NHC) and Central Pacific Hurricane Center, the Japan Meteorological Agency (JMA), the India Meteorological Department (IMD), Météo-France, Indonesia's Badan Meteorologi, Klimatologi, dan Geofisika, the Australian Bureau of Meteorology (BOM), Papua New Guinea's National Weather Service, the Fiji Meteorological Service (FMS) as well as New Zealand's MetService. Other notable warning centres include the Philippine Atmospheric, Geophysical and Astronomical Services Administration (PAGASA), the United States Joint Typhoon Warning Center (JTWC), and the Brazilian Navy Hydrographic Center.

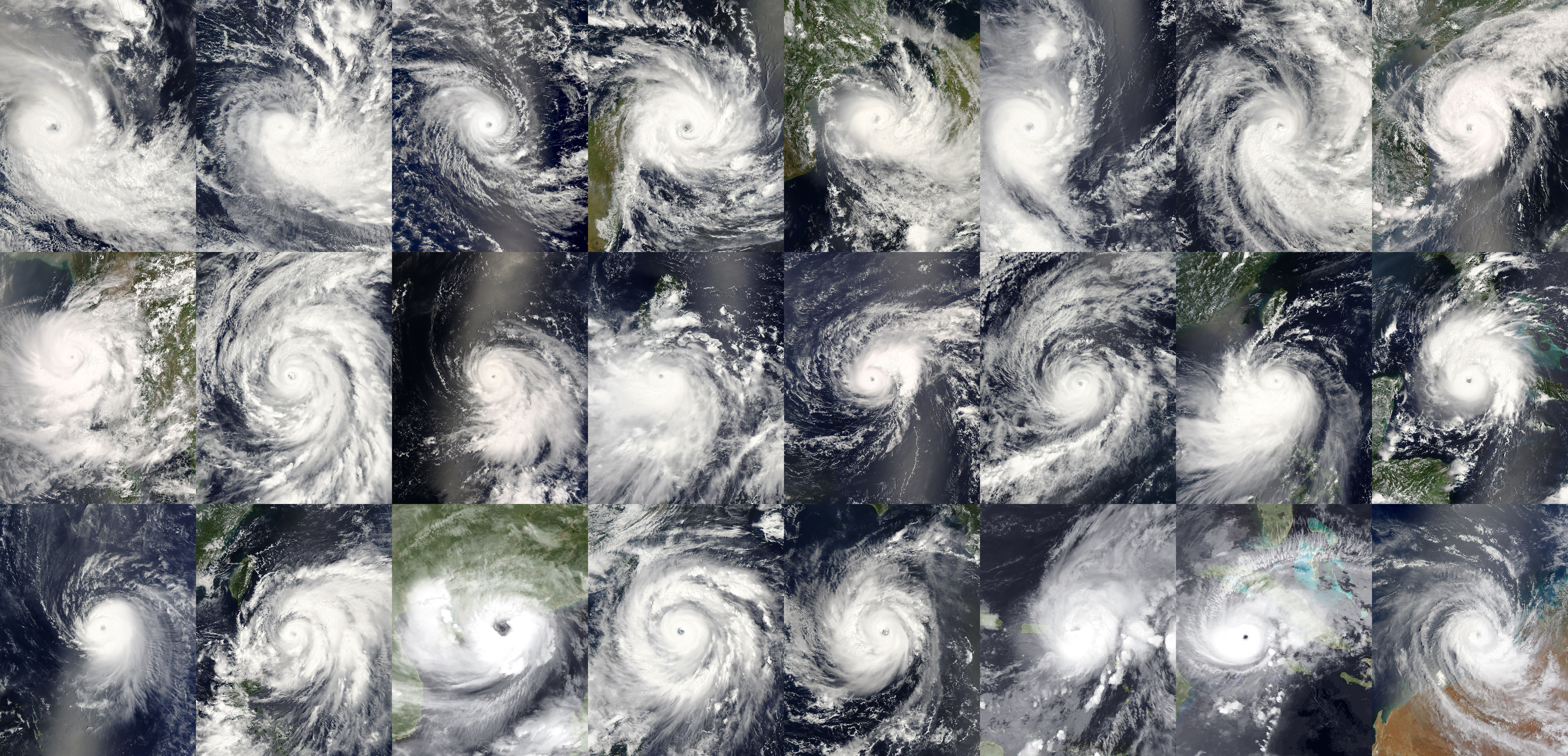
Satellite photos of the 24 tropical cyclones worldwide that reached at least Category 3 on the Saffir–Simpson scale during 2008, from Funa in January to Billy in December. Among them, Jangmi (fourth image in the final row) was the most intense, with a minimum central pressure of 905 hPa.

== Global atmospheric and hydrological conditions ==
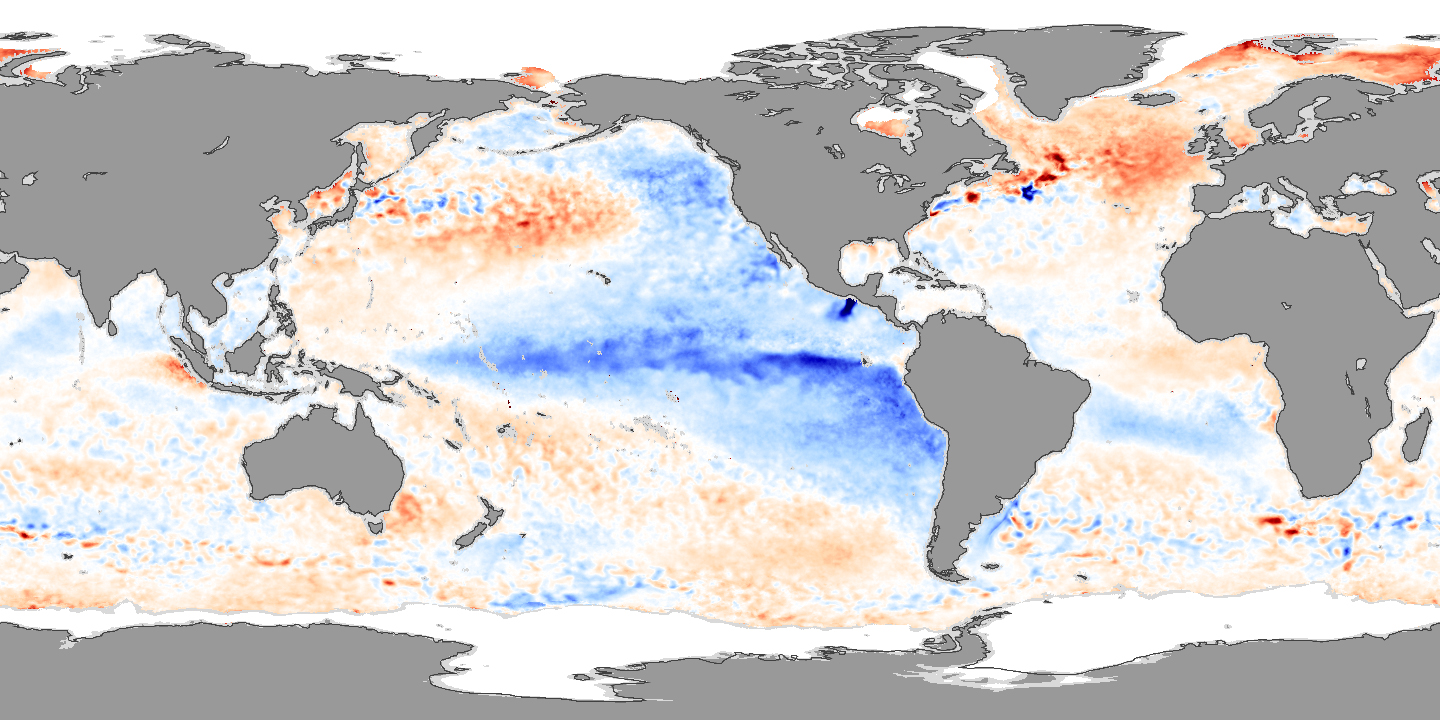
Sea surface temperature anomalies in November 2007, showing La Niña conditions that will continue until February 2008

== Summary ==
=== North Atlantic Ocean ===
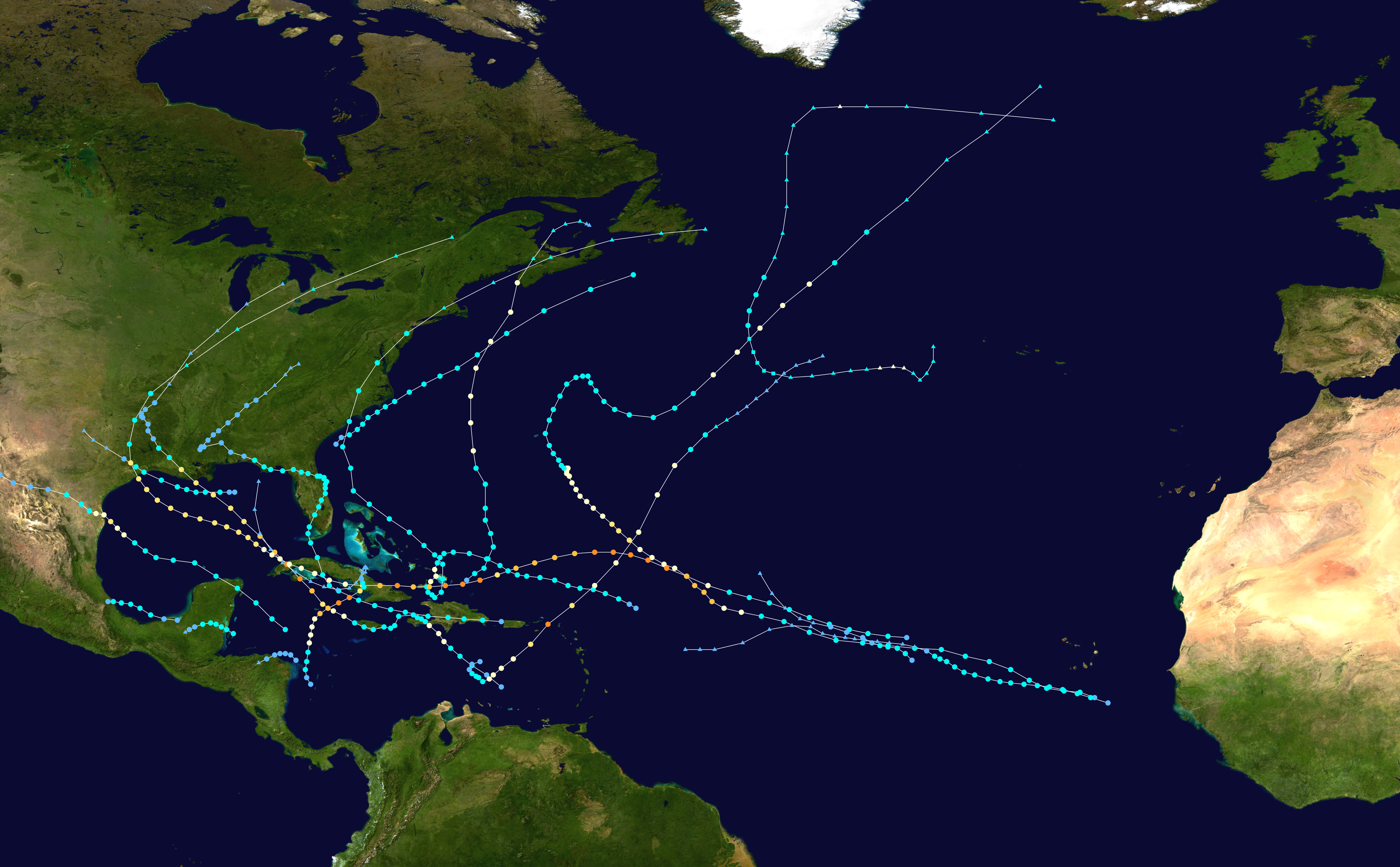
2008 Atlantic hurricane season summary map

=== Eastern Pacific Ocean ===
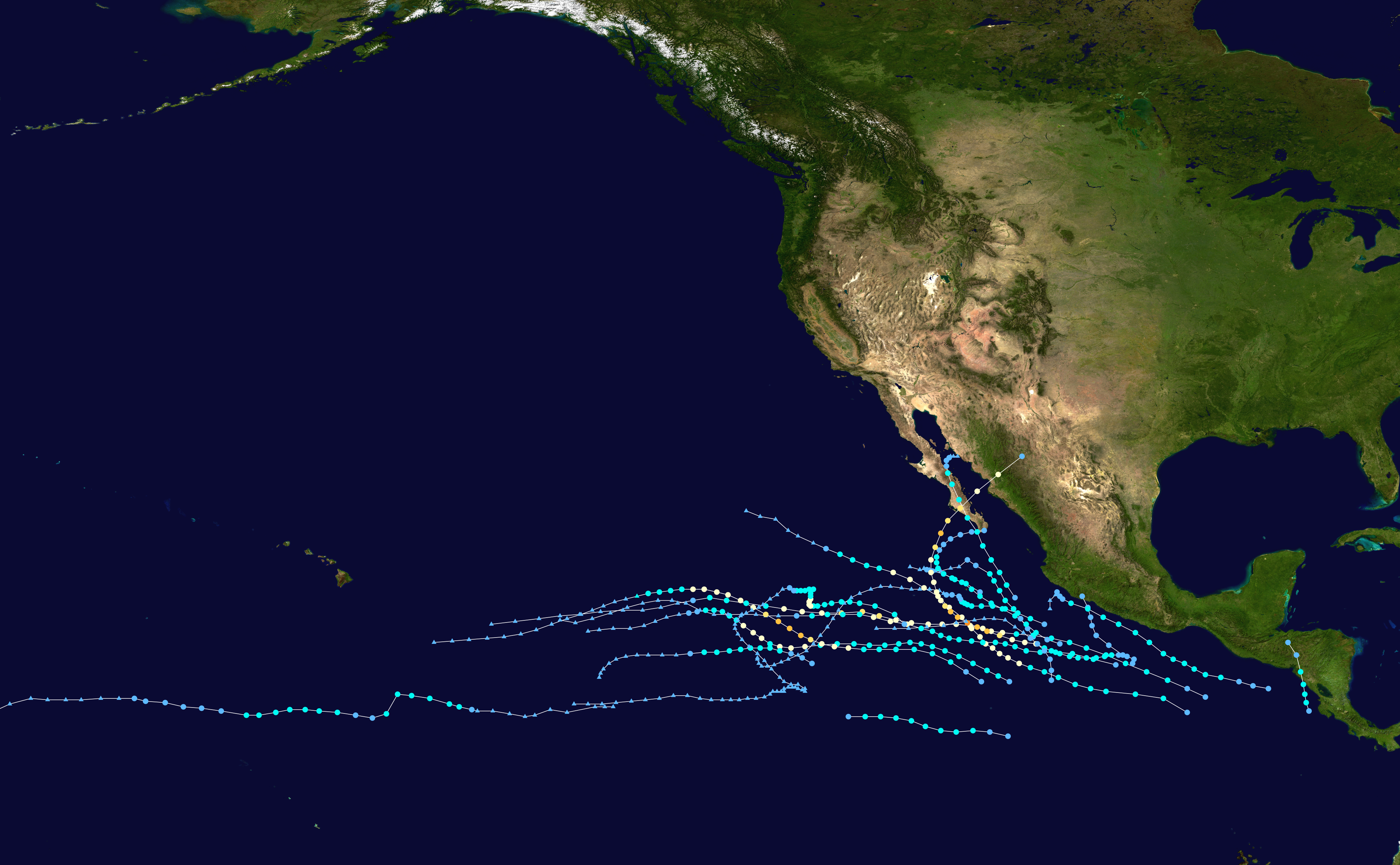
2008 Pacific hurricane season summary map

=== Western Pacific Ocean ===
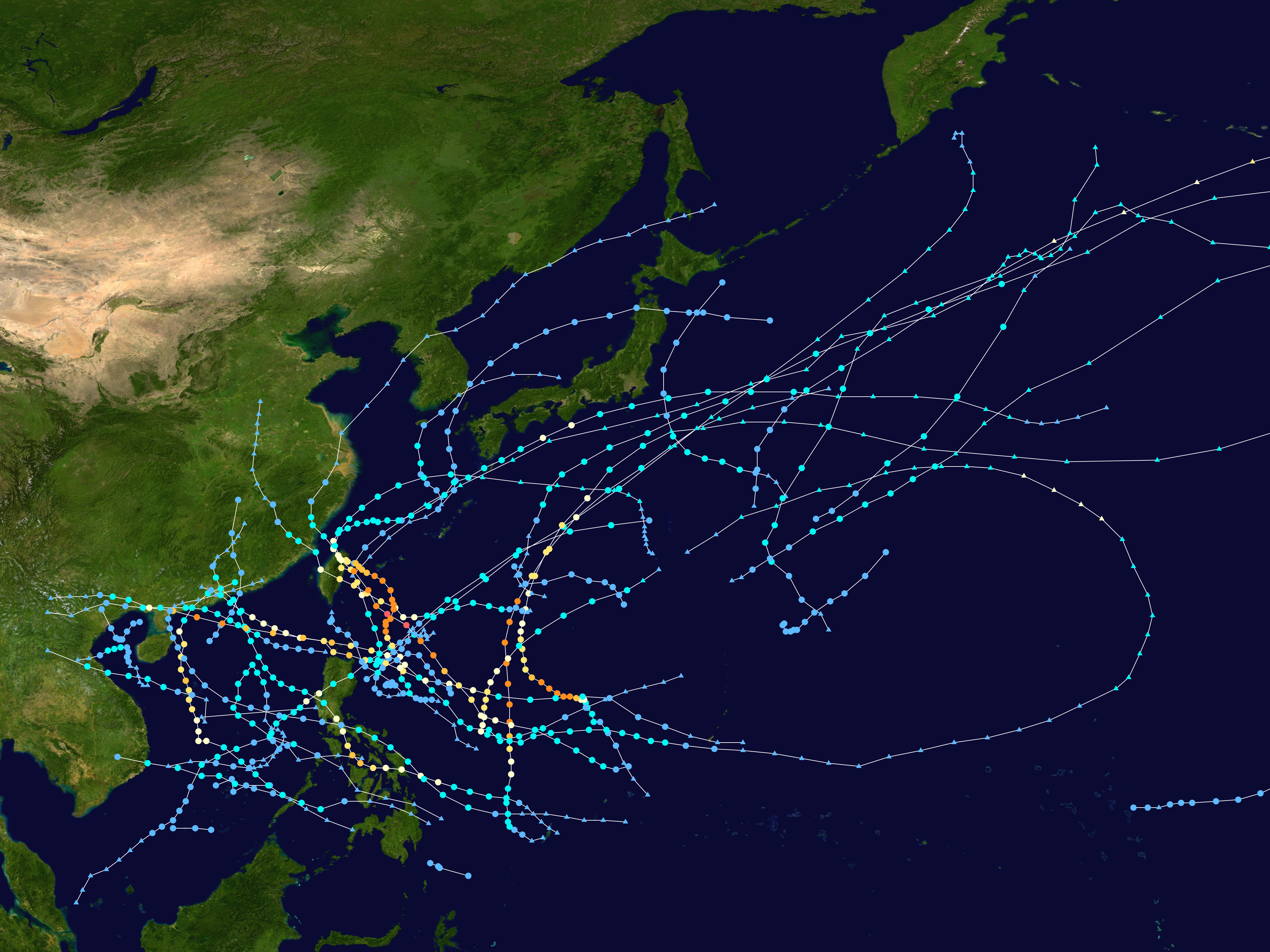
2008 Pacific typhoon season summary map

=== North Indian Ocean ===
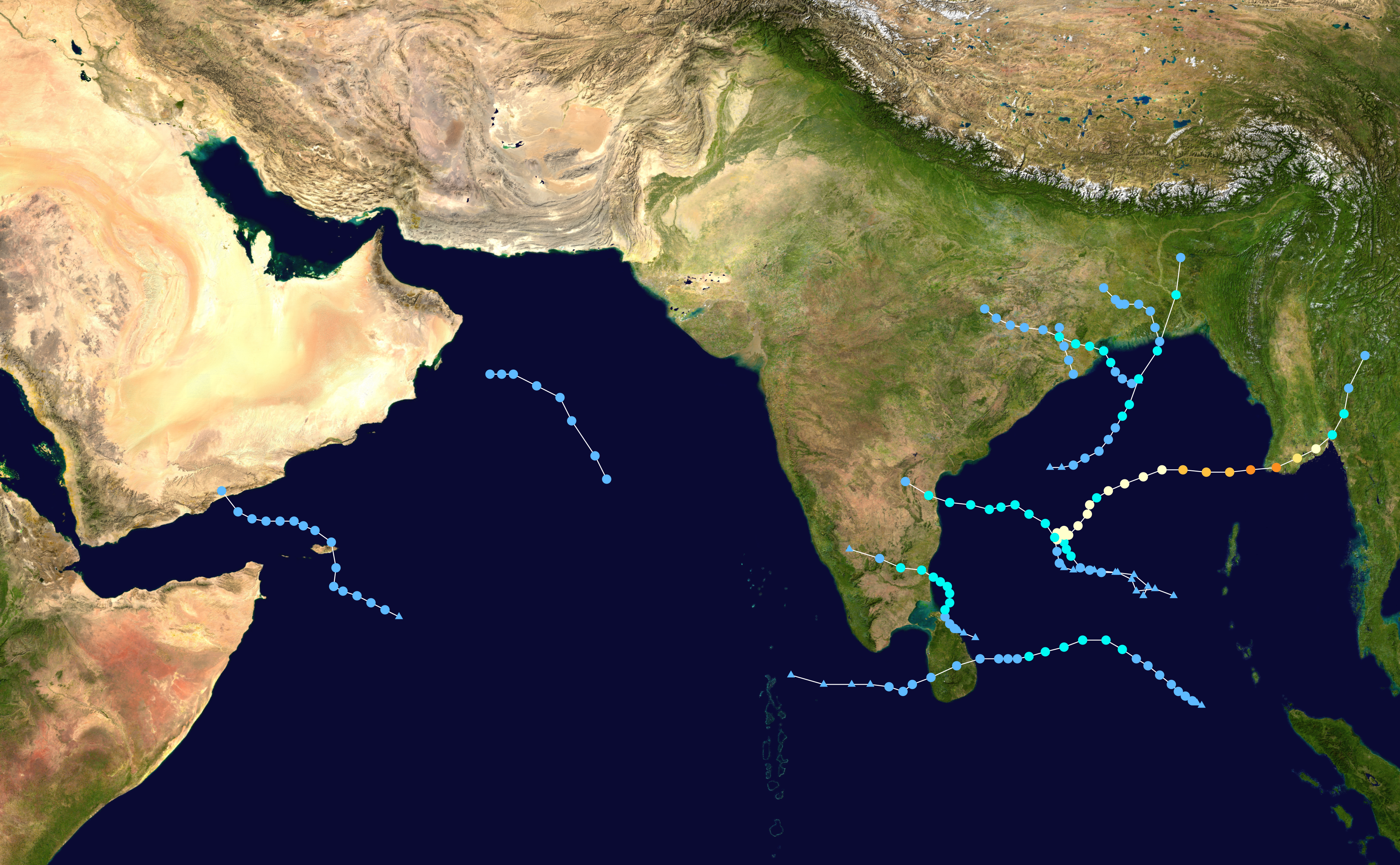
2008 North Indian Ocean cyclone season summary map

=== South-West Indian Ocean ===
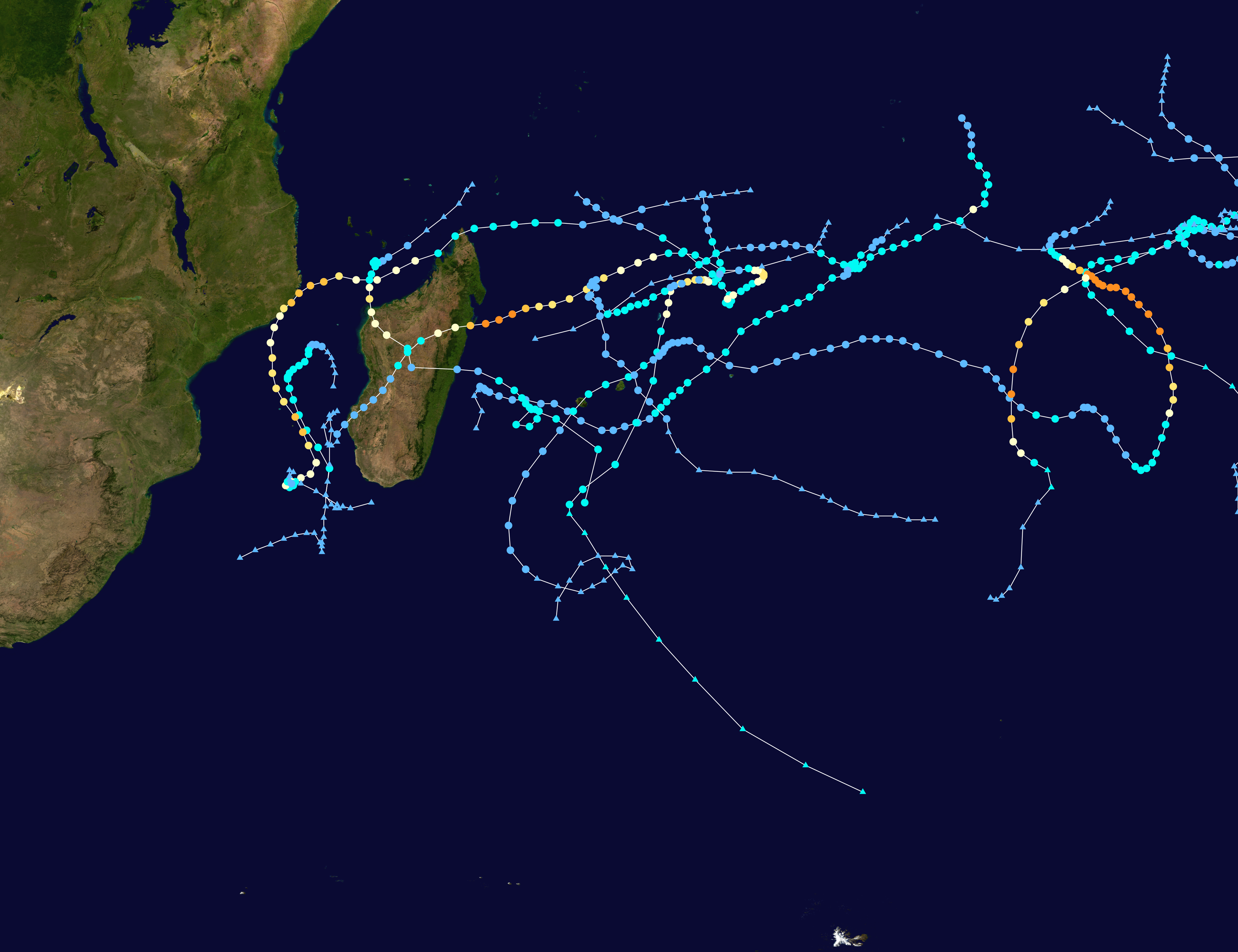
2007–08 South-West Indian Ocean cyclone season summary map

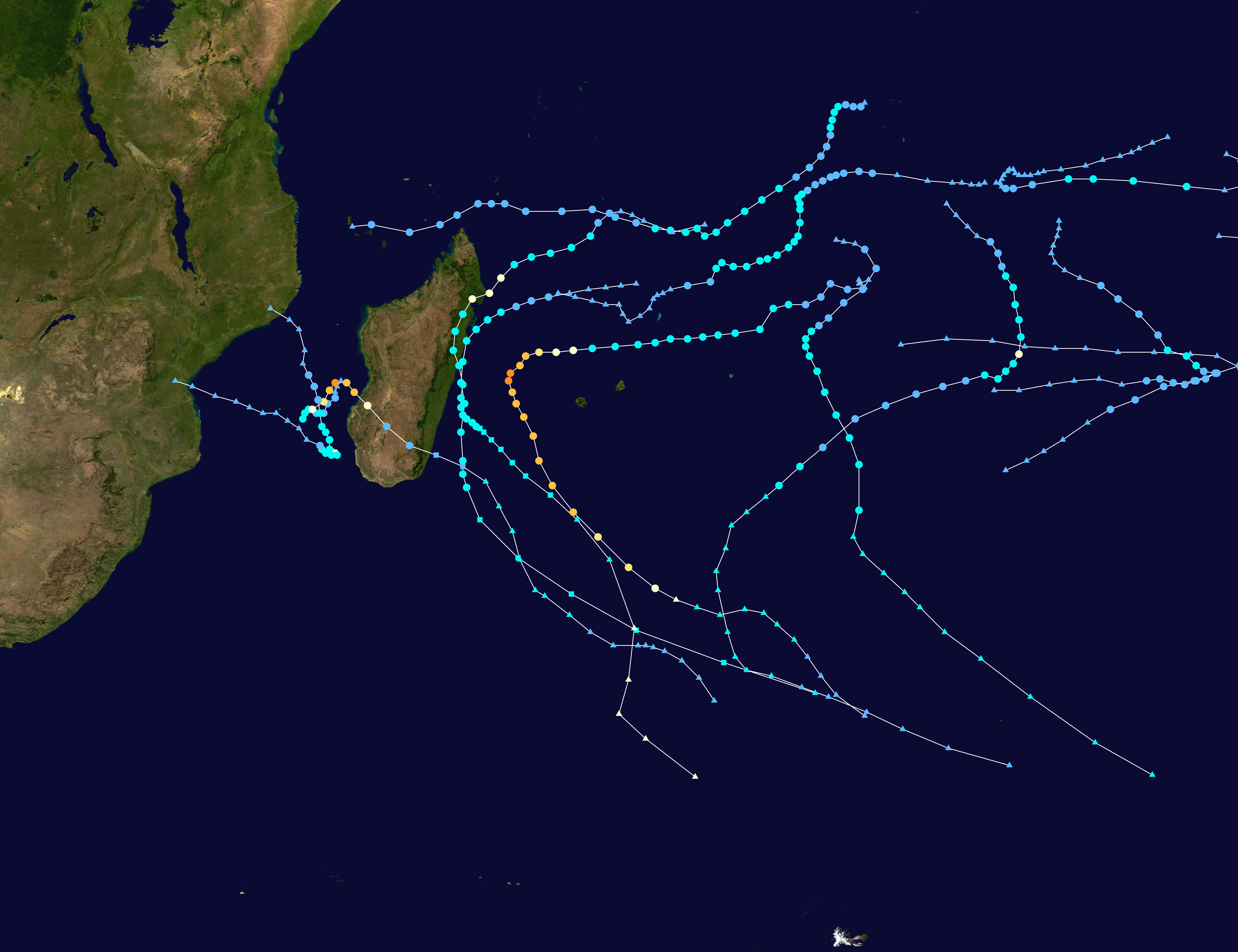
2008–09 South-West Indian Ocean cyclone season summary map

=== Australian Region ===
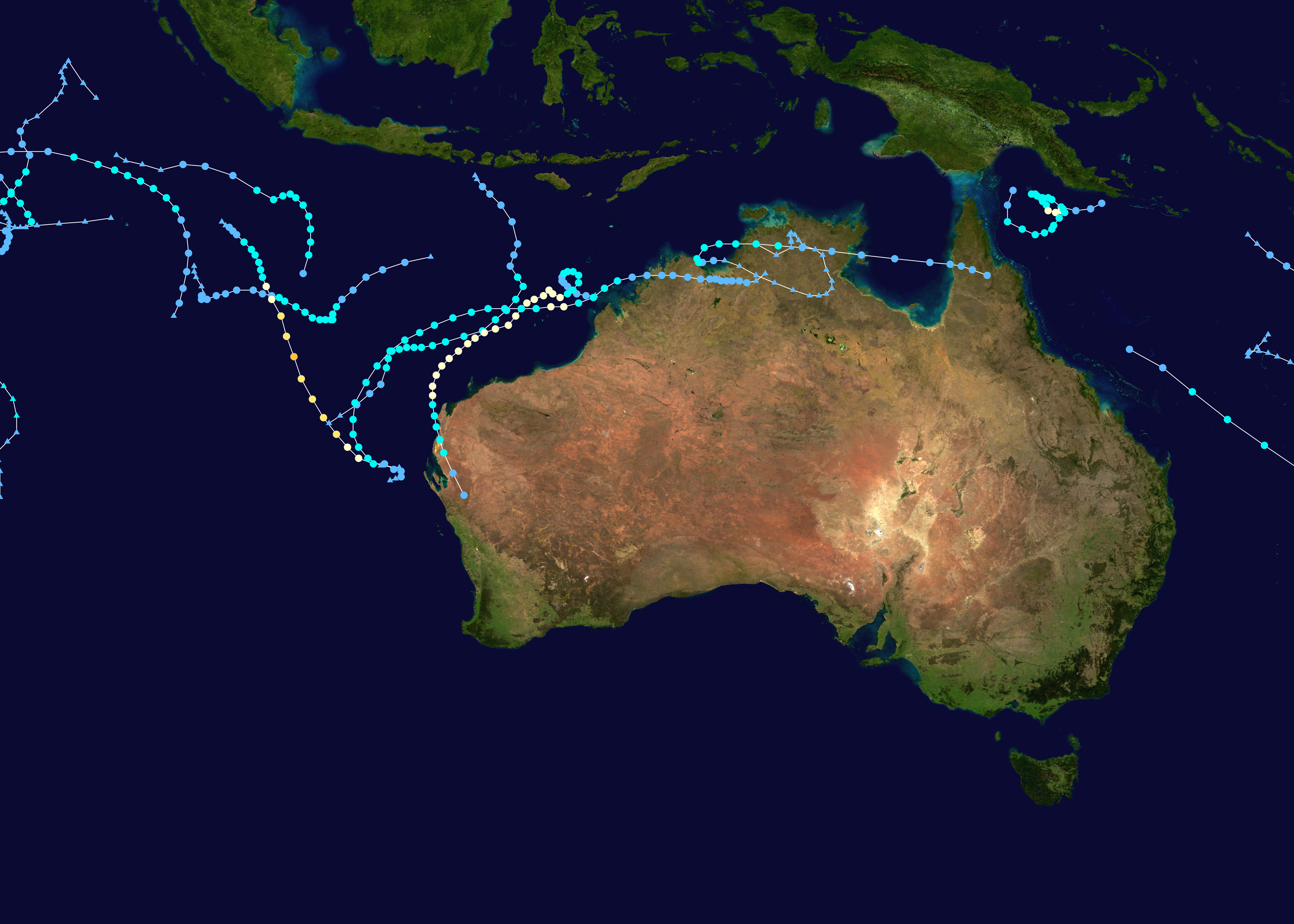
2007–08 Australian region cyclone season summary map

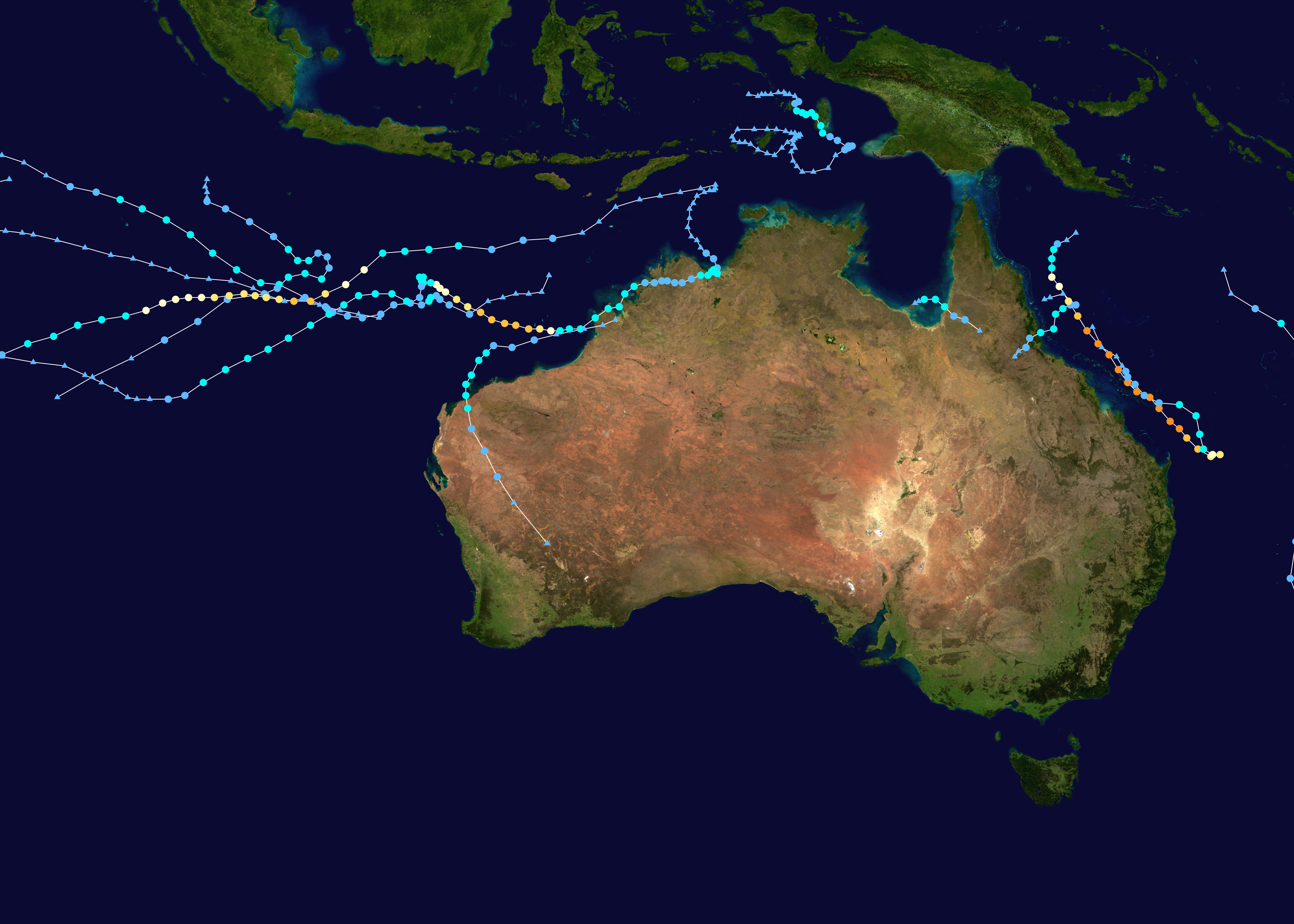
2008–2009 Australian region cyclone season summary map

=== South Pacific Ocean ===
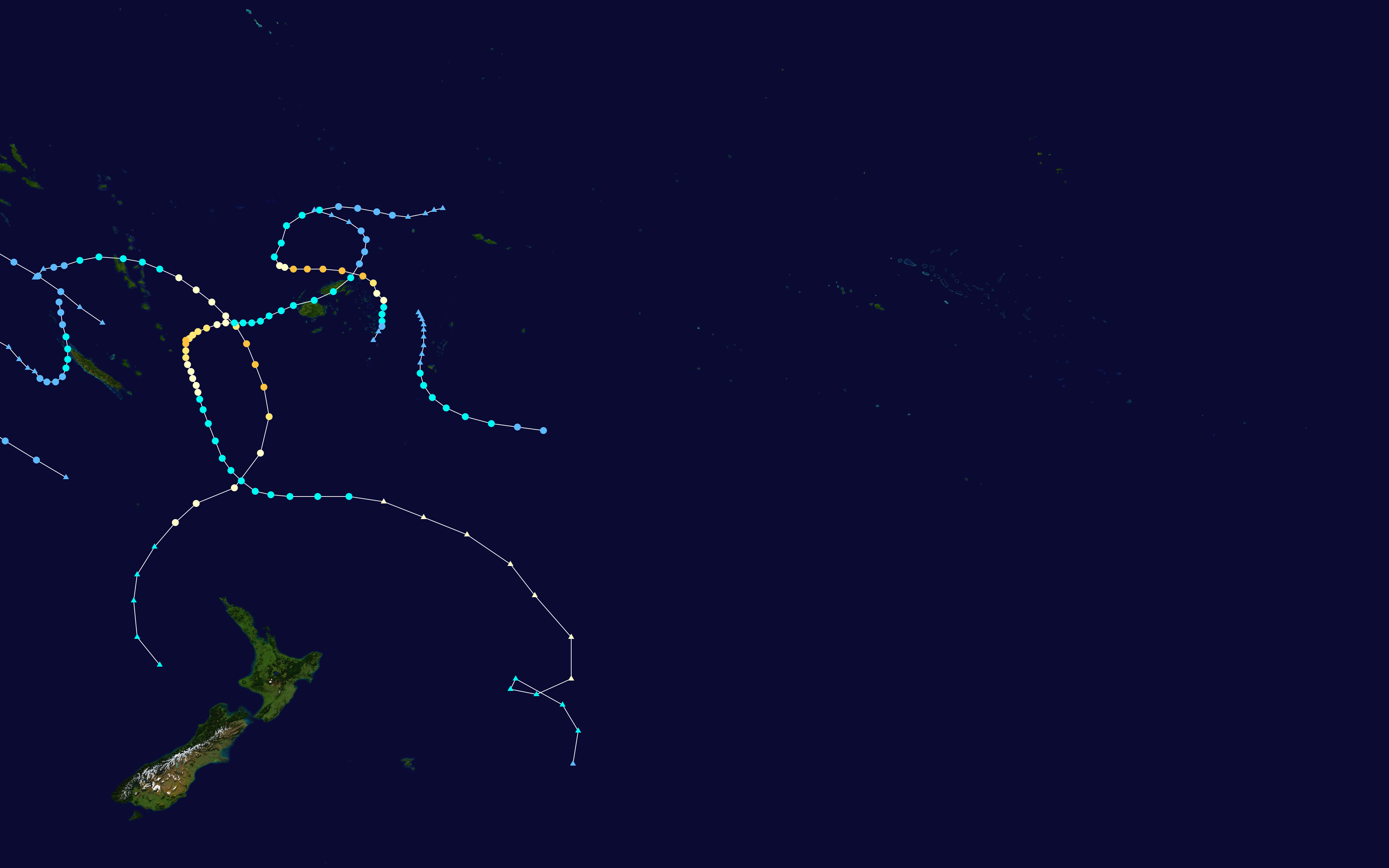
2007–08 South Pacific Ocean cyclone season summary map

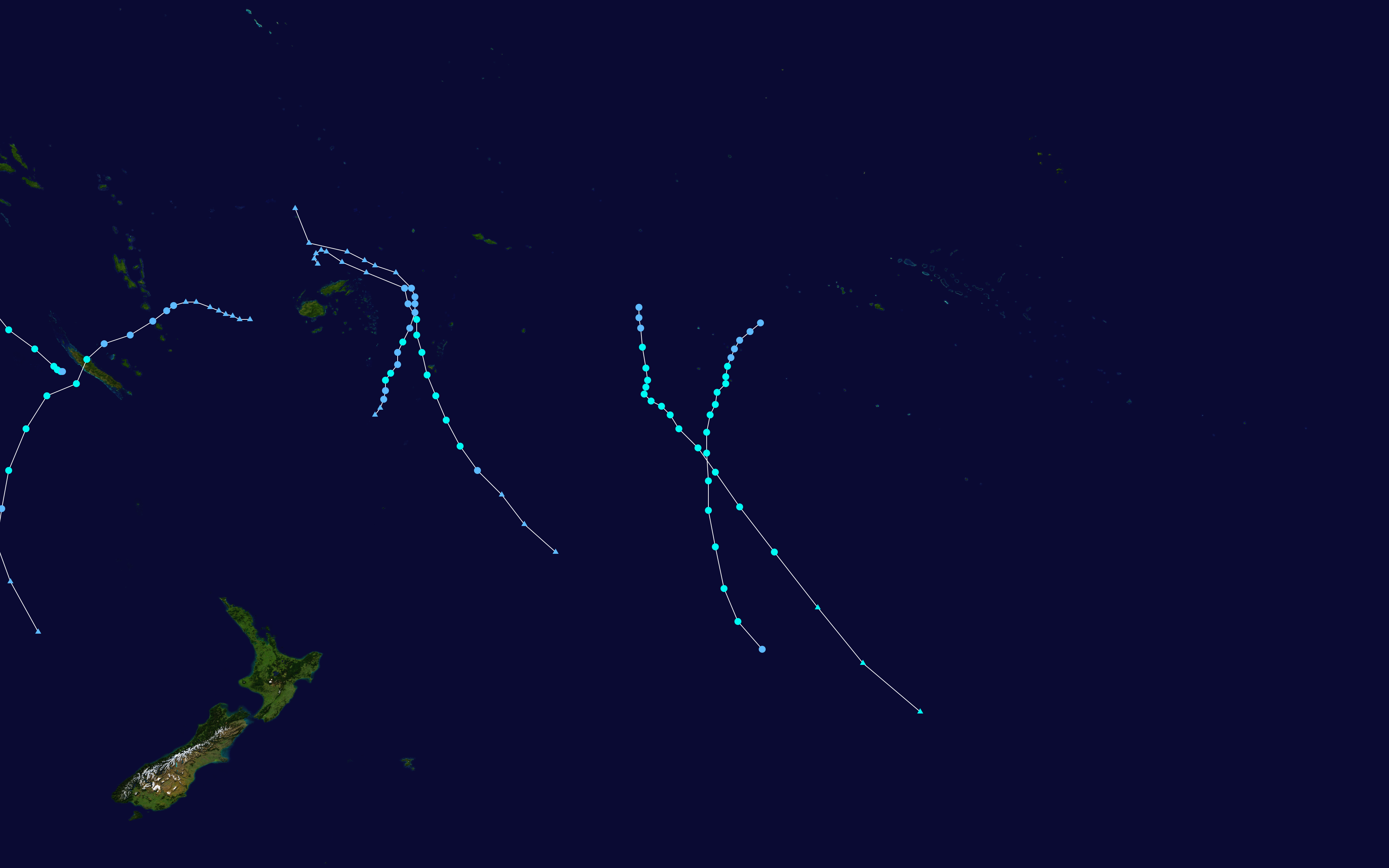
2008–09 South Pacific Ocean cyclone season summary map

=== Mediterranean Sea ===
In the Mediterranean Sea, there were 3 Mediterranean tropical-like cyclones formed, but they aren't well-documented. June 2008, August 2008, and September 2008, December 4, 2008 were the dates when they took shape. The damages, deaths, and the affected places are unknown.

== Systems ==
A total of 124 systems formed globally in the year with 83 of them causing significant damage, deaths, and/or setting records for their basin.

=== January ===
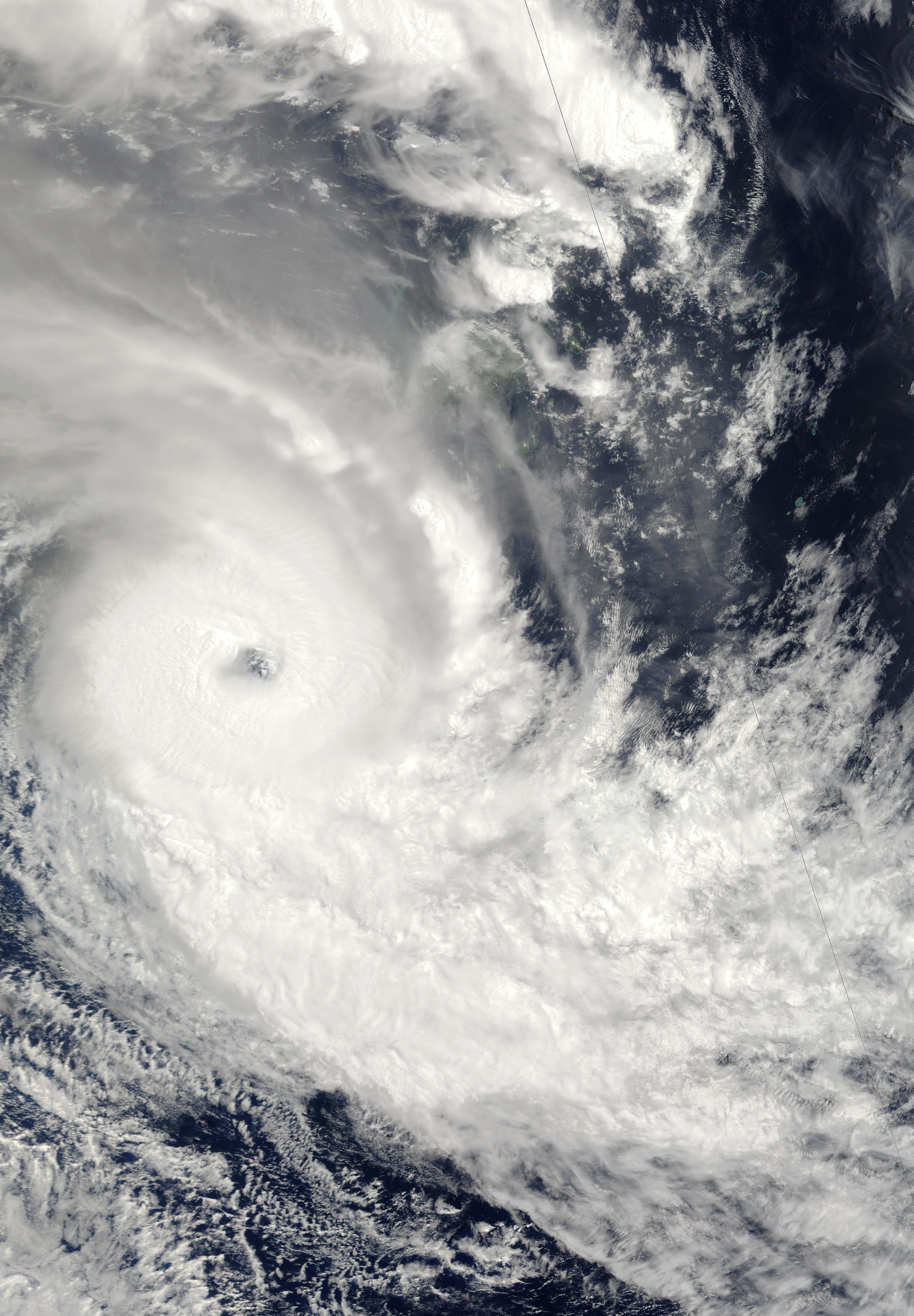
Cyclone Funa

The month of January was moderately active, seeing eleven tropical cyclones develop, with five being named. Tropical Cyclone Elisa affected Tonga and Niue as a tropical cyclone on early January, whileSevere Tropical Cyclone Funa became the second strongest tropical cyclone during the 2007–08 South Pacific cyclone season, causing heavy flood and wind damage to Vanuatu. On the South-West Indian Ocean basin, 3 more systems formed on the South-West Indian Ocean basin: 07, Fame and Gula, which caused torrential rainfall and gusty winds to the Mascarene Islands and Madagascar. 08F, 09F, 11F, and Guna formed on the South Pacific basin, while 2 systems formed in the West Pacific basin: 01W and an unmonitored weak tropical depression.

Tropical cyclones formed in January 2008
| Storm name | Dates active | Max wind km/h (mph) | Pressure (hPa) | Areas affected | Damage (USD) | Deaths | Refs |
|---|---|---|---|---|---|---|---|
| 07 | January 6–8 | 35 (25) | 1003 | Réunion | None | None | |
| Elisa | January 7–11 | 95 (60) | 980 | Fiji, Tonga | None | None | |
| 08F | January 9–14 | 45 (30) | 998 | Vanuatu, Fiji | None | None | |
| 09F | January 12–13 | Not specified | 999 | Tonga | None | None | |
| 01W | January 13–18 | 55 (35) | 1004 | Philippines, Malaysia | None | None | |
| Funa | January 15–21 | 175 (110) | 930 | Vanuatu, Fiji, New Zealand | Unknown | None | |
| 11F | January 19–24 | 75 (45) | 999 | Tonga | None | None | |
| TD | January 22–23 | Not specified | 1006 | None | None | None | |
| Fame | January 22–February 1 | 130 (80) | 972 | Comoros, Mayotte, Madagascar, Réunion | $51 thousand | 13 | |
| Gula | January 25–February 1 | 155 (100) | 950 | Mauritius | None | None | |
| Gene | January 26–February 6 | 155 (100) | 945 | Fiji, New Caledonia, Vanuatu | $35 million | 8 | |

=== February ===
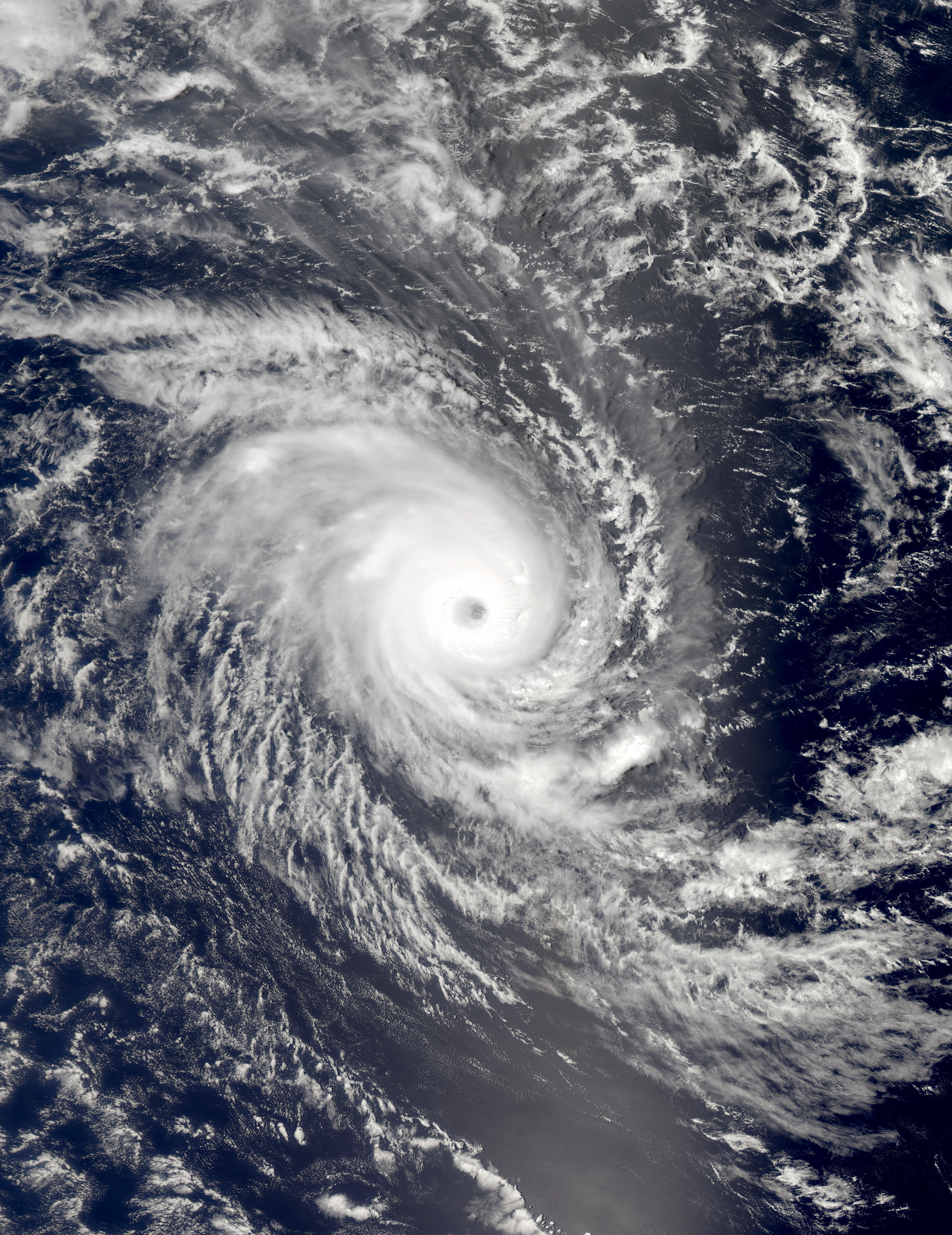
Cyclone Hondo

The month of February is tied with May as the second least active month in terms of formed systems with 7 tropical systems; however, 4 were named and developed hurricane-force winds and were classified as severe tropical cyclones. No tropical cyclones developed within the Northern Hemisphere, the fourth occurrence since 2005. Cyclone Hondo was the strongest and longest-lived tropical cyclone to develop during the 2007–08 South-West Indian Ocean cyclone season, which affected Mauritius and Reunion. On the South-west Indian Ocean basin, one more system formed: Cyclone Ivan which devastated Madagascar as an intense tropical cyclone. On the Australian basin, 4 systems took shape: a tropical low, Nicholas, Ophelia, and 20P. On the South Pacific basin, 13F formed, which affected Cook Islands in its lifetime.

Tropical cyclones formed in February 2008
| Storm name | Dates active | Max wind km/h (mph) | Pressure (hPa) | Areas affected | Damage (USD) | Deaths | Refs |
|---|---|---|---|---|---|---|---|
| Hondo | February 2–29 | 215 (130) | 915 | Mauritius, Réunion | Minimal | None | |
| Low (17S) | February 4–10 | 55 (35) | 990 | None | None | None | |
| Ivan | February 5–27 | 185 (115) | 930 | Madagascar | $30 million | 93 | |
| Nicholas | February 10–20 | 130 (80) | 956 | Western Australia | None | None | |
| 13F | February 17–18 | 45 (30) | 1008 | Cook Islands | None | None | |
| Ophelia | February 27–March 7 | 100 (65) | 976 | Northern Territory, Western Australia | None | None | |
| 20P | February 29 | 55 (35) | 999 | None | None | None | |

=== March ===
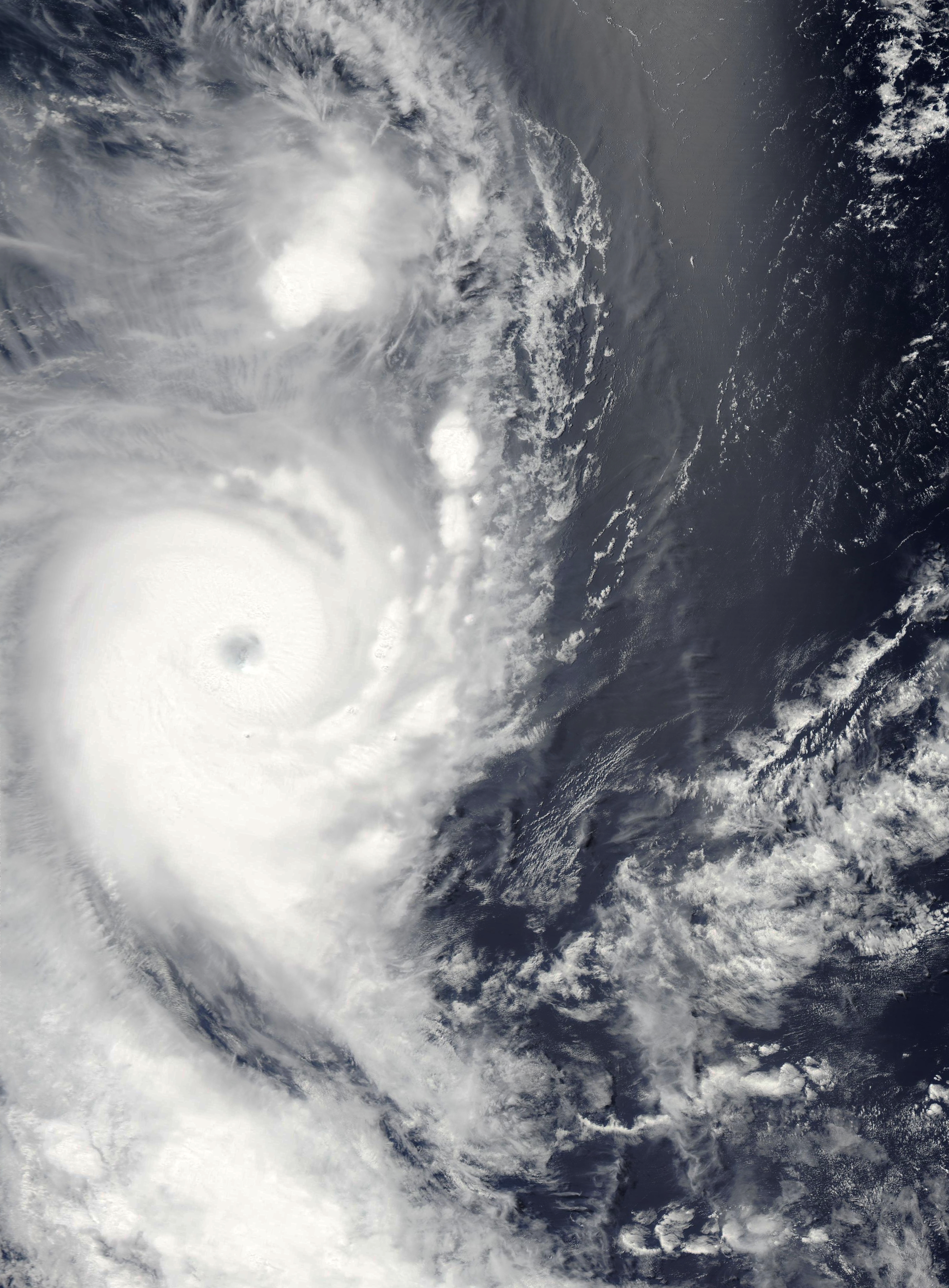
Cyclone Kamba

March is tied with April and June as the least active month, with just six tropical cyclones; however, four of them are named. Intense Tropical Cyclone Jokwe was the first tropical cyclone to make landfall in Mozambique since Cyclone Favio struck in the previous year, and was the most recent cyclone to make landfall on the same country until it was overtaken by Cyclone Dineo in 2017. 2 more systems formed in the southwest Indian Ocean basin: Kamba and Lola., with the latter affecting Mauritius. 14F formed on the South Pacific basin and brought little to none damages on New Caledonia, while Pancho formed on the Australian basin, affecting Christmas Island and Western Australia as a severe tropical cyclone. A tropical depression on the West Pacific was identified on March 26–27, affecting the Philippines.

Tropical cyclones formed in March 2008
| Storm name | Dates active | Max wind km/h (mph) | Pressure (hPa) | Areas affected | Damage (USD) | Deaths | Refs |
|---|---|---|---|---|---|---|---|
| Jokwe | March 2–16 | 195 (120) | 940 | Madagascar, Mozambique | $8 million | 16 | |
| Kamba | March 5–14 | 185 (115) | 930 | None | None | None | |
| Lola | March 18–27 | 65 (40) | 994 | Mauritius | None | None | |
| 14F | March 19–23 | 55 (35) | 998 | New Caledonia | None | None | |
| Pancho | March 25–29 | 165 (105) | 938 | Christmas Island, Western Australia | None | None | |
| TD | March 26–27 | Not specified | 1006 | Philippines | None | None | |

=== April ===
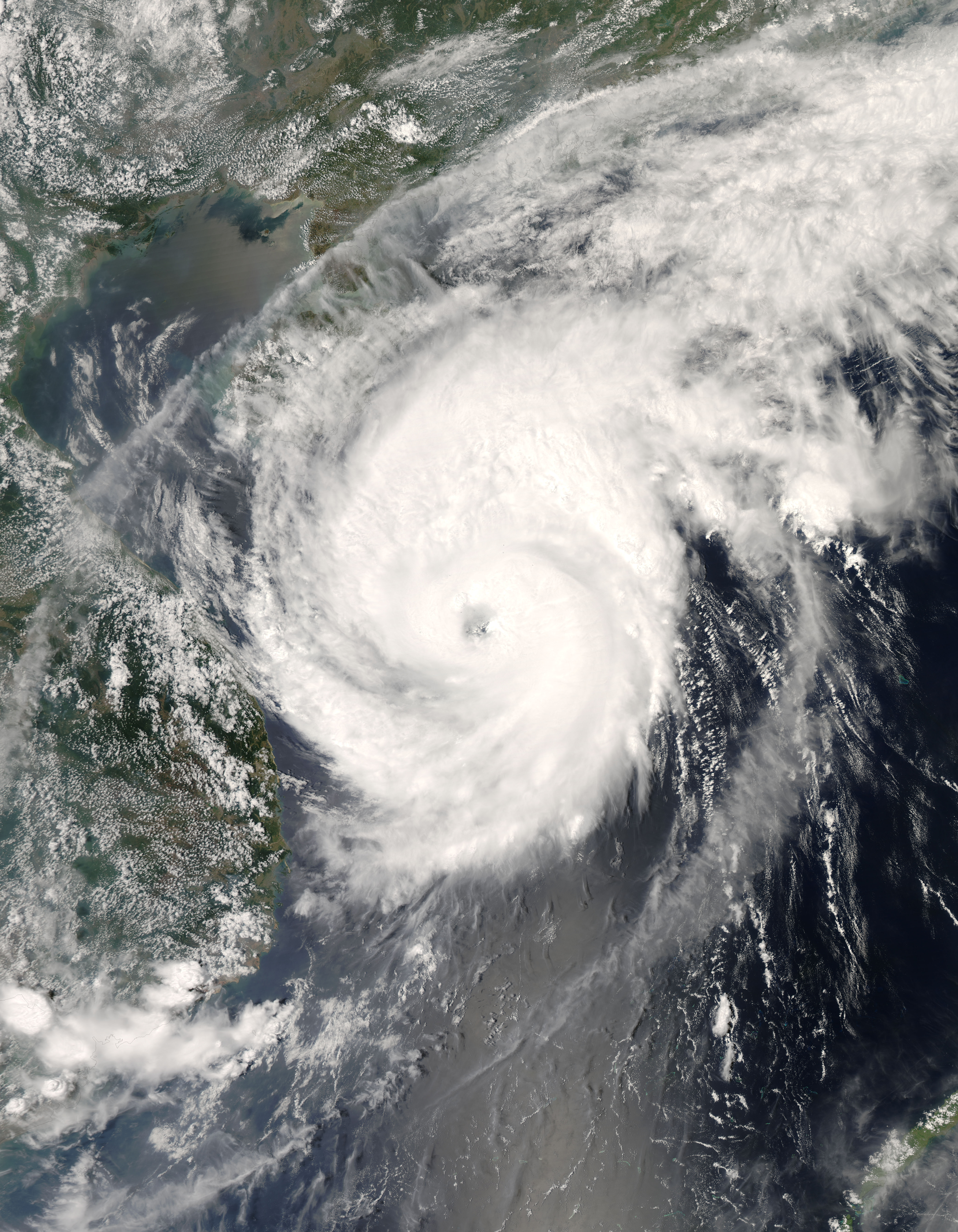
Typhoon Neoguri

The month of April is tied with March and June as the least active month, with just 6 systems developing; however, 4 are respectively named. Typhoon Neoguri was the earliest tropical cyclone on record to strike the mainland China, which left 26 deaths and over $65 million worth of damages to the said country. Also included here is Cyclone Nargis which is an extremely destructive and deadly tropical cyclone, and became the third-costliest tropical cyclone recorded in the Indian Ocean, just after Cyclone Amphan in 2020 and Cyclone Senyar in 2025. It left an unconfirmed total of 138,373 deaths; mainly on Myanmar and $12.9 billion worth of damages. 2 depressions formed on the South Pacific basin and affected Vanuatu and New Caledonia: 15F and 16F. Rosie and Durga formed on the Australian region; bringing minor damages and rainfall on Christmas Island and Cocos Islands.

Tropical cyclones formed in April 2008
| Storm name | Dates active | Max wind km/h (mph) | Pressure (hPa) | Areas affected | Damage (USD) | Deaths | Refs |
|---|---|---|---|---|---|---|---|
| 15F | April 4 – 7 | 45 (30) | 1002 | Vanuatu, New Caledonia | None | None | |
| Neoguri (Ambo) | April 13 – 21 | 150 (90) | 960 | Philippines, China | $65 million | 26 | |
| 16F | April 16 – 19 | 55 (35) | 998 | Vanuatu, New Caledonia | None | None | |
| Rosie | April 20 – 24 | 95 (60) | 988 | Christmas Island | Minor | None | |
| Durga | April 20 – 26 | 95 (60) | 984 | Cocos Islands | None | None | |
| Nargis | April 27 – May 3 | 165 (150) | 962 | Bangladesh, Myanmar, India, Sri Lanka, Thailand, Laos, China | $12.9 billion | ≥138,373 | |

=== May ===
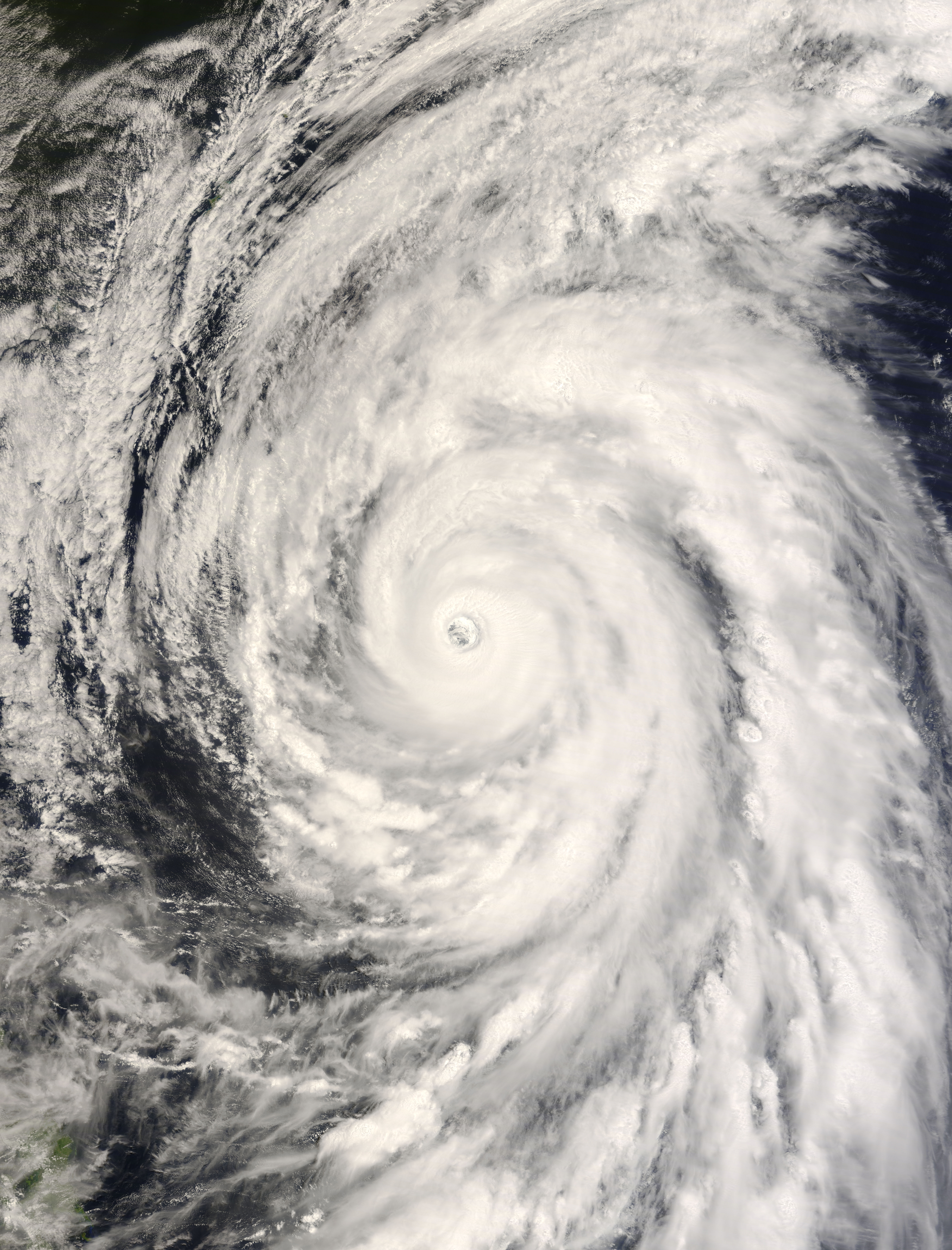
Typhoon Rammasun

The month of May was tied with February as the second-least active month, with seven systems developing; six of those being named. Included here is Typhoon Rammasun, which brought gusty rainfalls across eastern Philippines and paralleled on Japan before weakening. Matmo, a tropical depression, Nakri and Tropical Storm Halong also formed on the West Pacific, affecting Philippines, Japan, the Kamchatka Peninsula and the Mariana Islands. Tropical Storm Alma formed on the East Pacific basin. As it dissipated over Central America, its remnants interacted with two tropical waves, subsequently forming Tropical Storm Arthur on the Atlantic, which worsened the situations on the place which Alma made landfall.

| Storm name | Dates active | Max wind km/h (mph) | Pressure (hPa) | Areas affected | Damage (USD) | Deaths | Refs |
|---|---|---|---|---|---|---|---|
| Rammasun (Butchoy) | May 7 – 14 | 195 (120) | 915 | Philippines, Japan | $9.6 million | 4 | |
| Matmo (Dindo) | May 14 – 17 | 95 (60) | 992 | Philippines, Japan | None | None | |
| Halong (Cosme) | May 14 – 20 | 110 (70) | 970 | Philippines, Japan, Kamchatka Peninsula | $100 million | 61 | |
| Nakri (Enteng) | May 26 – June 3 | 185 (115) | 930 | Mariana Islands, Japan | None | None | |
| TD | May 27 – 28 | Not specified | 1006 | Philippines | None | None | |
| Alma | May 29 – June 1 | 100 (65) | 994 | Central America | $35 million | 11 | |
| Arthur | May 31 – June 1 | 75 (45) | 1004 | Honduras, Belize, Mexico, Guatemala | $78 million | 9 | |

=== June ===
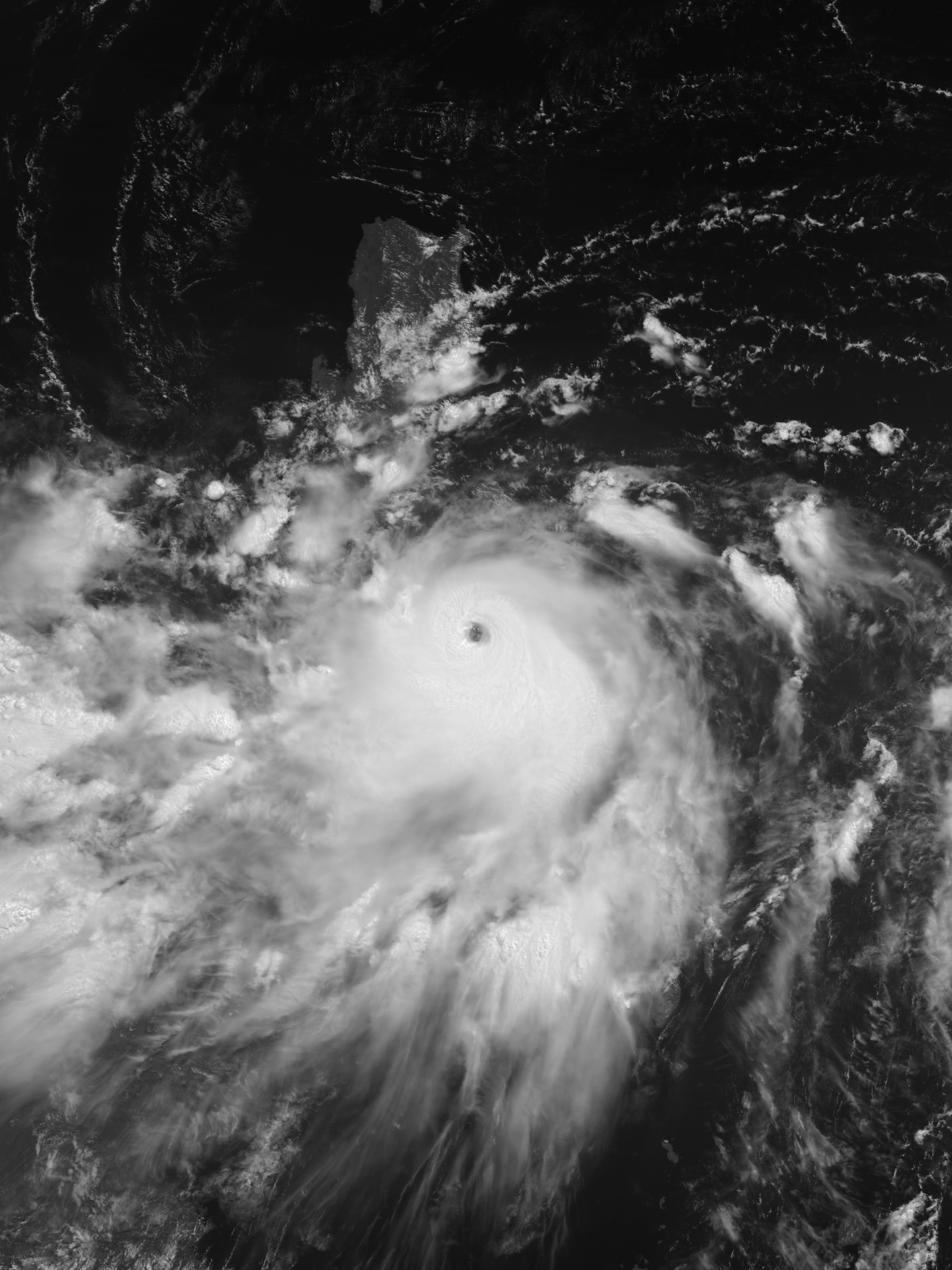
Typhoon Fengshen

The month of June is tied with March and April for the most inactive month with 6 systems developing; however, 3 are named. Fengshen made a direct hit on the Philippines and China, causing severe damage and resulted in at least 1,371 deaths and leaving at least 87 people missing. Another unmonitored tropical depression struck Taiwan and affected South Korea on June 6. On the North Indian Ocean basin, ARB 01 and BOB 02 formed; bringing torrential rainfall and damages on Oman, India and Bangladesh. Boris and Cristina took shape on the East Pacific basin; however, they stayed well from the land. An unidentified medicane formed in June 2008, however, it was unknown.

Tropical cyclones formed in June 2008
| Storm name | Dates active | Max wind km/h (mph) | Pressure (hPa) | Areas affected | Damage (USD) | Deaths | Refs |
|---|---|---|---|---|---|---|---|
| ARB 01 | June 5–7 | 45 (30) | 994 | Oman | None | None | |
| TD | June 6 | Not specified | 1006 | Taiwan, Ryukyu Islands | None | None | |
| BOB 02 | June 16–18 | 45 (30) | 988 | India, Bangladesh | Unknown | 54 | |
| Fengshen (Frank) | June 17–27 | 165 (105) | 945 | Palau, Philippines, Hong Kong, Macau, Guangdong | $480 million | 1,371 | |
| Boris | June 27 – July 4 | 80 (130) | 985 | None | None | None | |
| Cristina | June 27–30 | 50 (85) | 999 | None | None | None | |
| June 2008 Medicane | June | Not specified | Unknown | Unknown | Unknown | Unknown | |

=== July ===
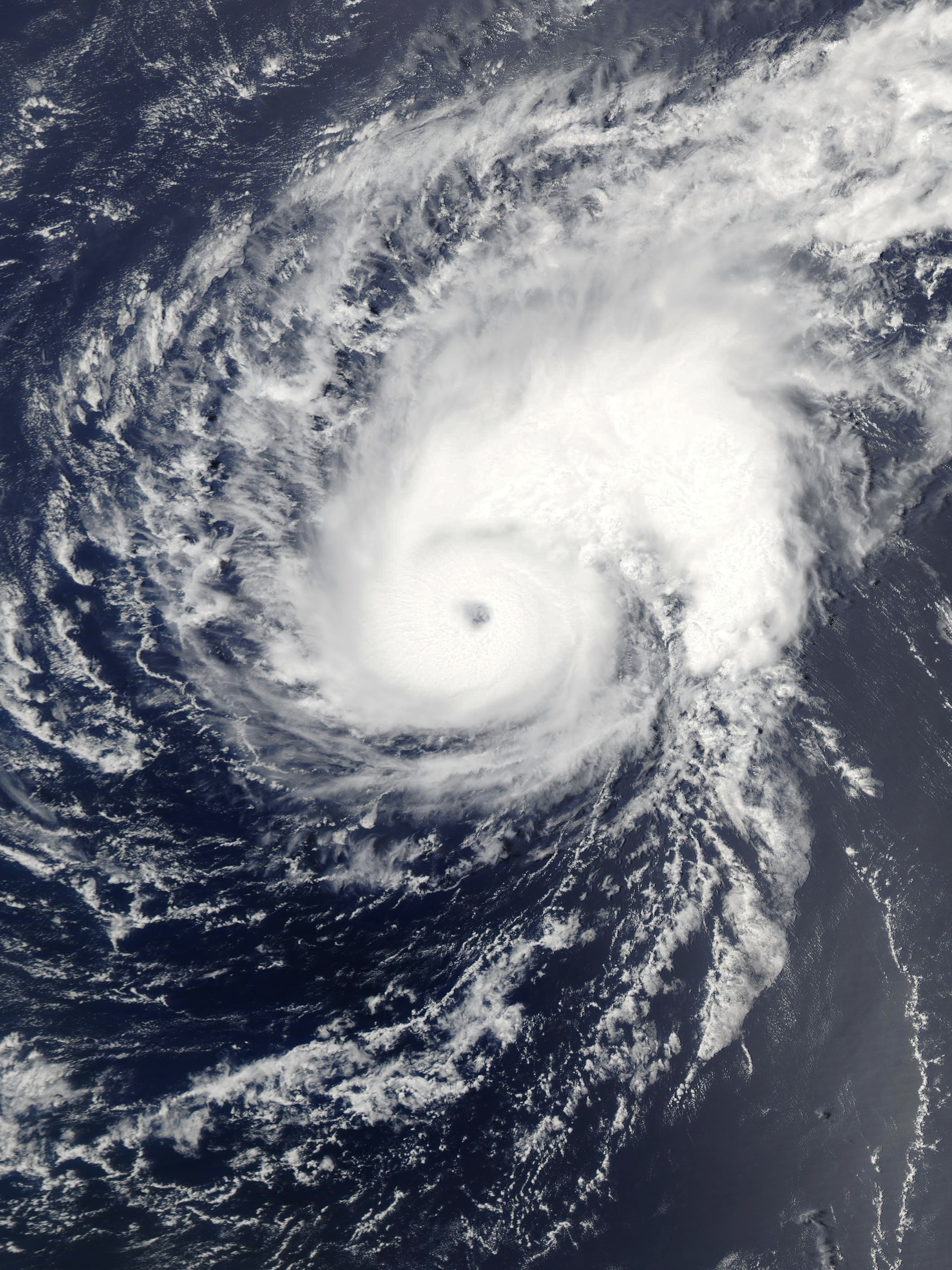
Hurricane Bertha

During July, thirteen tropical cyclones formed and the month became the third-most active month of the year, with ten of the cyclones being named. Included here is Bertha, which became the longest-lived Atlantic tropical cyclone on record during the month of July. It affected the East Coast of the United States and Bermuda, leaving 3 fatalities and minimal damages. A near hurricane-strength Cristobal skirted Florida and The Carolinas as a developing tropical storm, and the Atlantic Canada as an extratropical storm. Dolly severely impacted Texas, New Mexico and Arizona as a Category 3 major hurricane, while it affected the Yucatán Peninsula and Mexico as a tropical storm. It was responsible for 22 fatalities and $1.6 billion worth of damages. Back in the West Pacific, the activity started with Gener which impacted Guangdong Province in China. Kalmaegi followed, skirting to the east of Philippines before impacting Taiwan and China. It was responsible for $332.3 million worth of damages and 25 deaths. Adding on, Fung-wong severely impacted Taiwan as a Category 2 typhoon, just 10 days after Kalmaegi lashed the country. 2 more weak depressions formed; however, it didn't affect any landmasses. On the East Pacific, Douglas started the activity, skirting to the northeast of Mexico. A tropical depression brought torrential rainfalls across Southwestern Mexico, leaving 2 deaths and $2.2 million worth of damages. Elida, Fausto and Genevieve followed suit; however, it didn't affect any major landmasses, but it brought rainfalls across Clarion Island and Socorro Island.

Tropical cyclones formed in July 2008
| Storm name | Dates active | Max wind km/h (mph) | Pressure (hPa) | Areas affected | Damage (USD) | Deaths | Refs |
|---|---|---|---|---|---|---|---|
| Douglas | July 1–4 | 40 (65) | 1003 | Northwestern Mexico, Baja California Peninsula | None | None | |
| Bertha | July 3–20 | 125 (205) | 952 | Cabo Verde, Bermuda, East Coast of the United States | Minimal | 3 | |
| Gener | July 4–8 | 55 (35) | 1000 | China | None | None | |
| Five-E | July 5–7 | 35 (55) | 1005 | Southwestern Mexico, Western Mexico | $2.2 million | 2 | |
| TD | July 6–9 | Not specified | 1004 | None | None | None | |
| Elida | July 11–19 | 105 (165) | 970 | Southwestern Mexico, Hawaii | None | None | |
| TD | July 13–15 | Not specified | 1006 | None | None | None | |
| Kalmaegi (Helen) | July 13–20 | 120 (75) | 970 | Philippines, Taiwan, China, Korea, Japan | $332 million | 25 | |
| Fausto | July 15–22 | 90 (150) | 977 | Clarion Island, Socorro Island | Minimal | None | |
| Cristobal | July 19–23 | 65 (100) | 998 | Southeastern United States, Atlantic Canada | $10,000 | None | |
| Dolly | July 20–27 | 100 (155) | 963 | Cayman Islands, Honduras, Belize, Guatemala, Yucatán Peninsula, Mexico, Texas, New Mexico, Arizona | $1.6 billion | 22 | |
| Genevieve | July 21–27 | 75 (120) | 987 | Hawaii | None | None | |
| Fung-wong (Igme) | July 23–30 | 140 (85) | 960 | Northern Luzon, Taiwan, mainland China | $541 million | 23 | |

=== August ===
Hurricane Gustav

August was the second most active month of the year, seeing 18 tropical cyclones forming and 14 named storms.

Tropical cyclones formed in August 2008
| Storm name | Dates active | Max wind km/h (mph) | Pressure (hPa) | Areas affected | Damage (USD) | Deaths | Refs |
|---|---|---|---|---|---|---|---|
| Edouard | August 3–6 | 100 (65) | 996 | Florida, Alabama, Mississippi, Louisiana, Texas, Oklahoma | $550,000 | 6 | |
| Kammuri (Julian) | August 3–8 | 95 (60) | 975 | Philippines, China, Vietnam, Hong Kong | $200 million | 204 | |
| Hernan | August 6–12 | 195 (120) | 956 | Hawaii | None | None | |
| Kika | August 7–12 | 65 (40) | 1007 | None | None | None | |
| BOB 03 | August 9–10 | 45 (30) | 1004 | Orissa, West Bengal | Unknown | 61 | |
| Phanfone | August 9–11 | 95 (60) | 996 | None | None | None | |
| TD | August 10–12 | Not specified | 998 | China | None | None | |
| TD | August 11–15 | Not specified | 1000 | Japan, South Korea | None | None | |
| 11W | August 12–15 | 55 (35) | 998 | Japan, South Korea | Minor | None | |
| Iselle | August 13–16 | 85 (50) | 999 | None | None | None | |
| Vongfong | August 14–17 | 95 (60) | 990 | Japan | Minor | 1 | |
| Kika | August 14–16 | 35 (25) | 1010 | None | None | None | |
| Fay | August 15–27 | 110 (70) | 986 | Leeward Islands, Greater Antilles, Southeastern United States | $560 million | 36 | |
| Nuri (Karen) | August 17–23 | 140 (85) | 955 | Philippines, Mainland China, Hong Kong | $85 million | 20 | |
| Julio | August 23–27 | 85 (50) | 998 | Baja California Sur, Sinaloa, Arizona, Nevada, California | $1 million | 2 | |
| Gustav | August 25 – September 7 | 250 (155) | 941 | Lesser Antilles, Greater Antilles, Gulf Coast of the United States, Midwestern United States | $8.31 billion | 153 | |
| 14W (Lawin) | August 26–28 | 55 (35) | 1002 | Philippines, Taiwan | None | None | |
| Hanna | August 28 – September 12 | 140 (85) | 977 | Puerto Rico, Turks and Caicos Islands, Bahamas, Hispaniola, Eastern Seaboard, Atlantic Canada | $160 million | ~537 | |
| August 2008 Medicane | August | Not specified | Unknown | Unknown | Unknown | Unknown | |

=== September ===
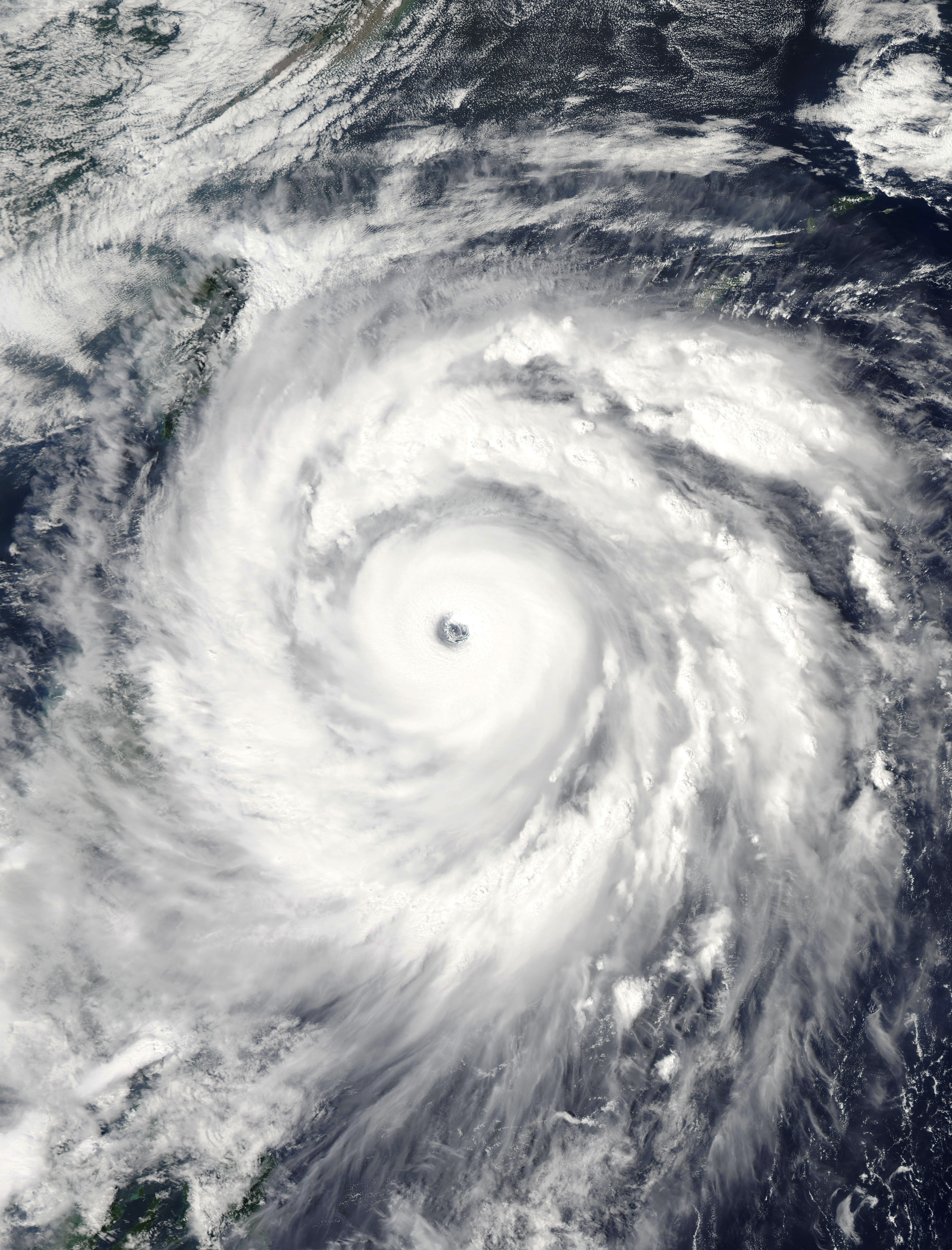
Typhoon Jangmi

Tropical cyclones formed in September 2008
| Storm name | Dates active | Max wind km/h (mph) | Pressure (hPa) | Areas affected | Damage (USD) | Deaths | Refs |
|---|---|---|---|---|---|---|---|
| Ike | September 1–15 | 230 (145) | 935 | Hispaniola, Turks and Caicos Islands, The Bahamas, Cuba, Gulf Coast of the United States, Midwestern United States, Eastern Canada, Iceland | $38 billion | 214 | |
| Josephine | September 2–6 | 100 (65) | 994 | Cabo Verde, Saint Croix | Minimal | None | |
| Karina | September 2–3 | 65 (40) | 1000 | Socorro Island | None | None | |
| Lowell | September 6–11 | 85 (50) | 998 | Baja California Sur, Sinaloa, Sonora, Nayarit, New Mexico, Texas, Colorado, Oklahoma, Kansas, Socorro Island | $15.5 million | 6 | |
| Sinlaku (Marce) | September 8–25 | 185 (115) | 935 | Philippines, Taiwan, People's Republic of China, Japan | $1.1 billion | 14 | |
| 16W | September 9–11 | 55 (35) | 1002 | Japan | None | None | |
| 17W | September 13–14 | 45 (30) | 1010 | None | None | None | |
| BOB 04 | September 15–19 | 55 (35) | 986 | India | Unknown | 25 | |
| Hagupit (Nina) | September 18–25 | 165 (105) | 935 | Philippines, Taiwan, Hong Kong, China, Vietnam | $1 billion | 102 | |
| Jangmi (Ofel) | September 23 – October 5 | 215 (130) | 905 | Taiwan, Japan | $87.7 million | 6 | |
| Kyle | September 25–30 | 140 (85) | 984 | Puerto Rico, Hispaniola, Bermuda, New England, Atlantic Canada, southeastern Quebec | $57.1 million | 8 | |
| Mekkhala | September 27–30 | 85 (50) | 990 | Vietnam, Laos, Thailand | $6.6 million | 16 | |
| Laura | September 29 – October 4 | 95 (60) | 994 | Azores, Atlantic Canada, Greenland, Europe | Minimal | None | |
| Higos (Pablo) | September 29 – October 6 | 65 (40) | 998 | Philippines, China | $6.5 million | Unknown | |

=== October ===
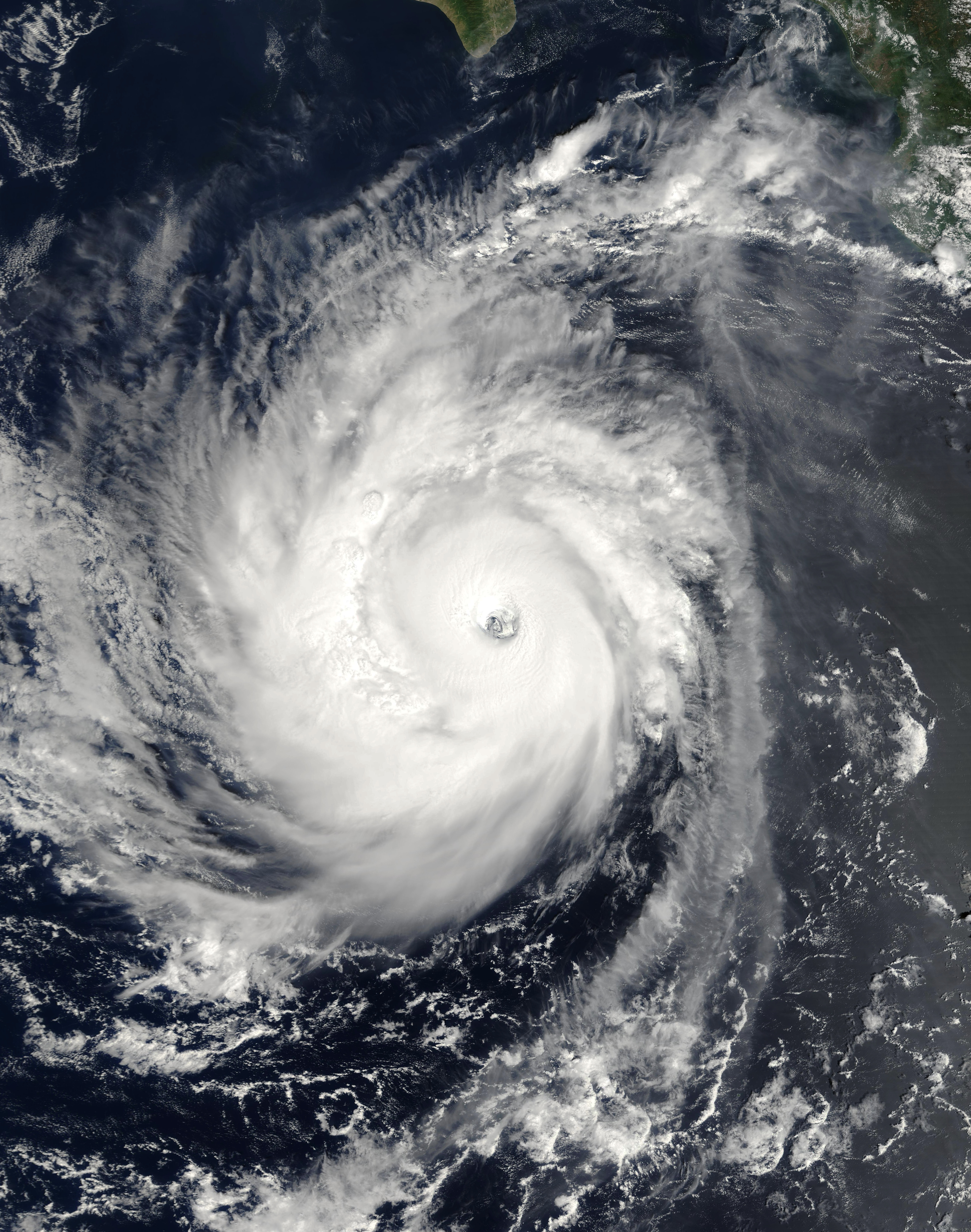
Hurricane Norbert

Tropical cyclones formed in October 2008
| Storm name | Dates active | Max wind km/h (mph) | Pressure (hPa) | Areas affected | Damage (USD) | Deaths | Refs |
|---|---|---|---|---|---|---|---|
| Marie | October 1–6 | 130 (80) | 984 | None | None | None | |
| Norbert | October 3–12 | 215 (130) | 945 | Baja California Sur, Sonora, Sinaloa | $98.5 million | 25 | |
| Marco | October 6–7 | 100 (65) | 998 | Mexico | Minimal | None | |
| 01 | October 6–8 | 35 (25) | 1006 | None | None | None | |
| Odile | October 8–12 | 95 (60) | 997 | Nicaragua, Honduras, El Salvador, Guatemala, Southwestern Mexico | Minimal | None | |
| Nana | October 12–14 | 65 (40) | 1004 | None | None | None | |
| 22W | October 12–15 | 55 (35) | 1006 | China, Vietnam | Moderate | None | |
| Omar | October 13–21 | 215 (130) | 958 | Venezuela, Leeward Antilles, Leeward Islands, Puerto Rico | $80 million | 1 | |
| Sixteen | October 14–15 | 45 (30) | 1004 | Honduras, Belize, Nicaragua | ≥ $150 million | 9 | |
| Asma | October 15–24 | 85 (50) | 988 | Comoros, Northern Madagascar, Mozambique, Tanzania | Unknown | 1 | |
| Bavi | October 18–20 | 85 (50) | 992 | None | None | None | |
| ARB 02 | October 19–23 | 55 (35) | 1000 | Yemen | $1.638 billion | 180 | |
| Seventeen-E | October 23–24 | 55 (35) | 1008 | None | None | None | |
| Rashmi | October 25–27 | 85 (50) | 984 | Bangladesh, India | Unknown | 28 | |

=== November ===
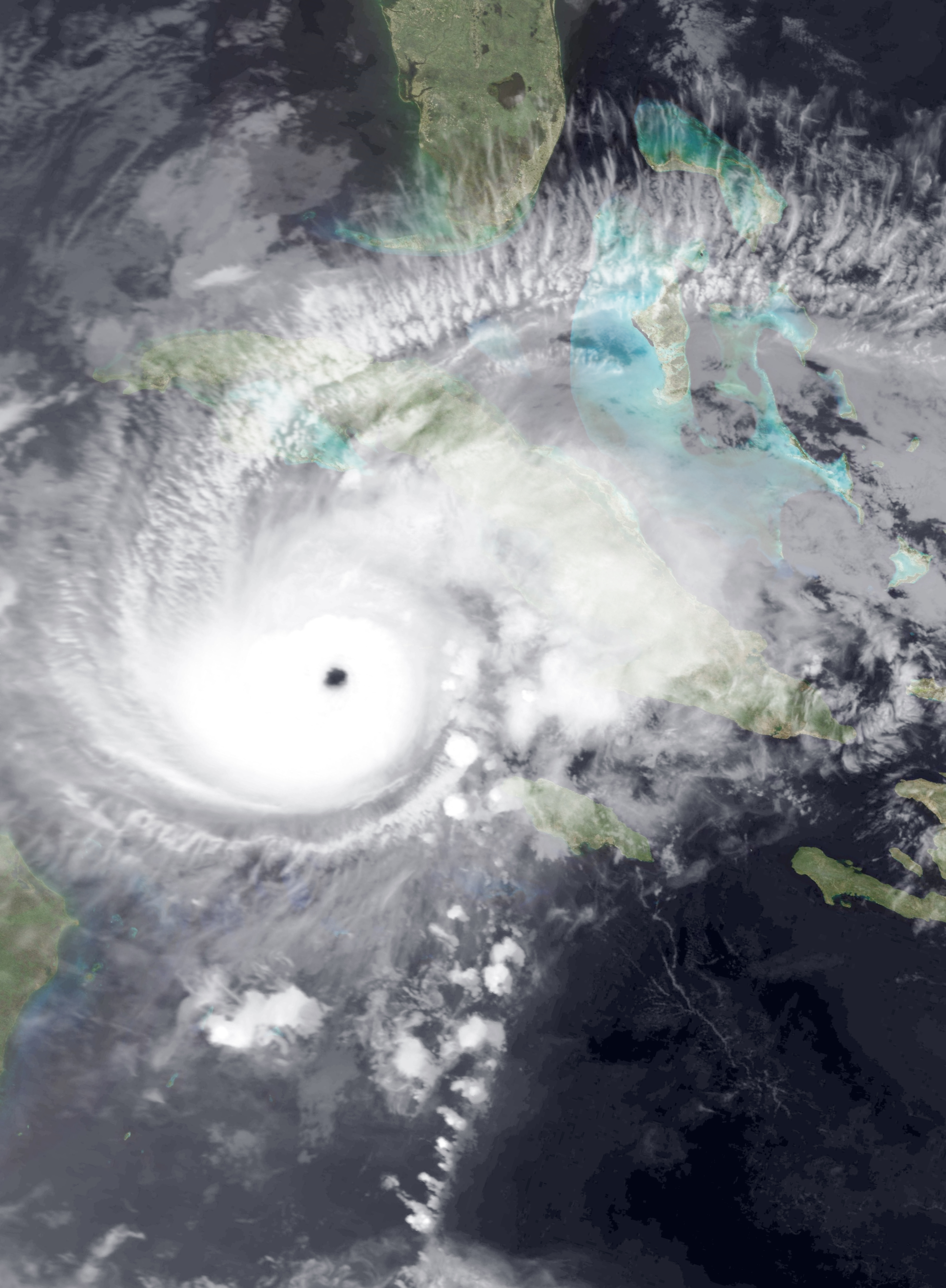
Hurricane Paloma

Tropical cyclones formed in November 2008
| Storm name | Dates active | Max wind km/h (mph) | Pressure (hPa) | Areas affected | Damage (USD) | Deaths | Refs |
|---|---|---|---|---|---|---|---|
| Polo | November 2–5 | 75 (45) | 1003 | None | None | None | |
| Paloma | November 5–14 | 230 (145) | 944 | Central America, Jamaica, Cayman Islands, Cuba, Bahamas, Florida | $454.5 million | 1 | |
| Maysak (Quinta–Siony) | November 6–14 | 95 (60) | 985 | Philippines | Minimal | 19 | |
| Rolly | November 7–9 | 55 (35) | 1006 | Philippines | None | None | |
| TD | November 11–12 | Not specified | 1004 | None | None | None | |
| Khai-Muk | November 13–16 | 65 (40) | 996 | India | $314 million | None | |
| Bernard | November 13–21 | 65 (40) | 995 | None | None | None | |
| Haishen | November 14–17 | 75 (45) | 1004 | None | None | None | |
| Noul (Tonyo) | November 14–17 | 75 (45) | 994 | Philippines, Vietnam, Cambodia | $8.4 million | 21 | |
| Anika | November 17–22 | 95 (60) | 990 | Cocos Island | None | None | |
| 01U | November 21 | 35 (25) | 1003 | None | None | None | |
| Nisha | November 25–29 | 85 (50) | 996 | Sri Lanka, India | $800 million | 204 | |

=== December ===
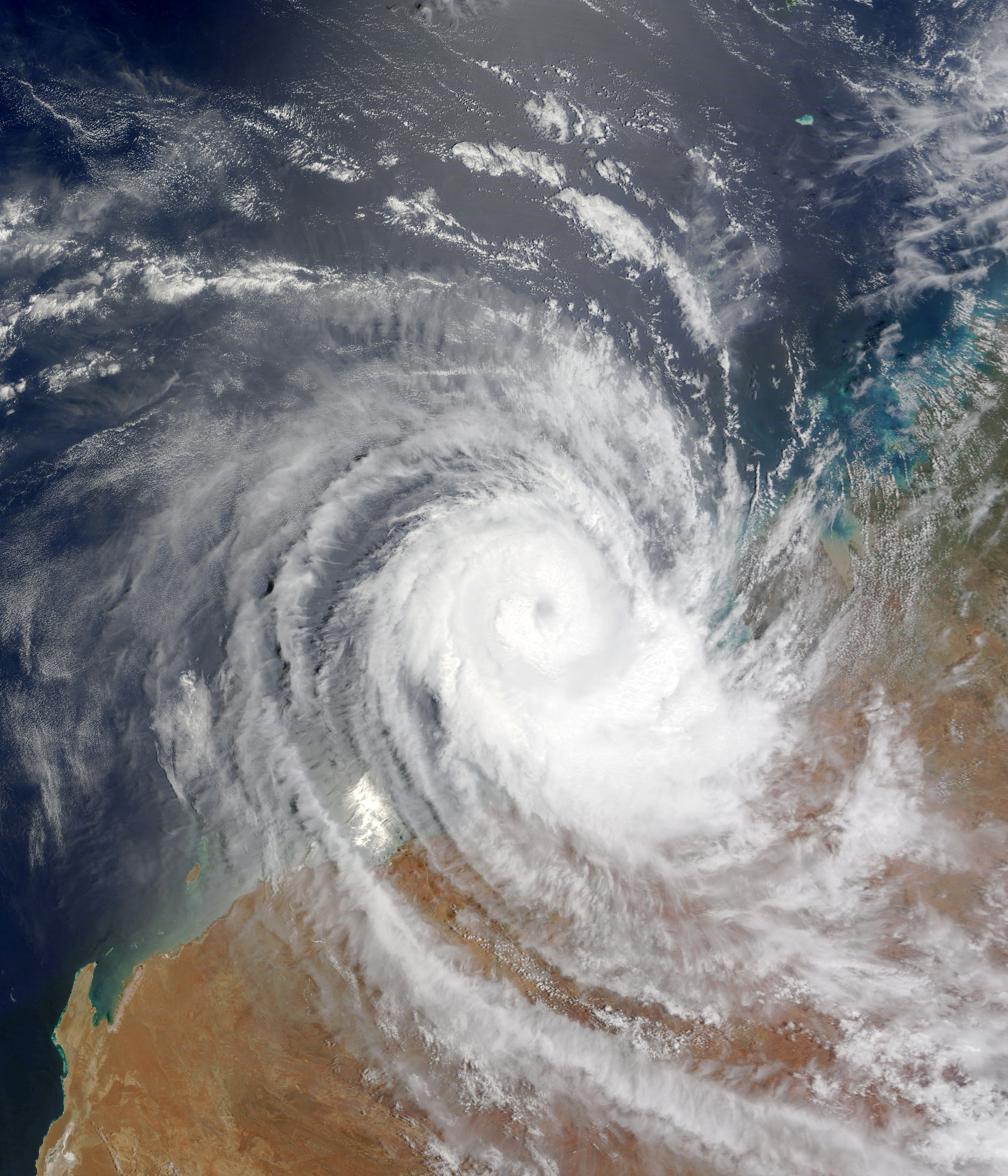
Severe Tropical Cyclone Billy

Tropical cyclones formed in December 2008
| Storm name | Dates active | Max wind km/h (mph) | Pressure (hPa) | Areas affected | Damage (USD) | Deaths | Refs |
|---|---|---|---|---|---|---|---|
| 01F | December 1–2 | Not specified | 1006 | None | None | None | |
| TD | December 2 | Not specified | 1006 | None | None | None | |
| 02F | December 3–6 | 45 (30) | 1004 | Cook Islands | None | None | |
| BOB 08 | December 4–7 | 55 (35) | 1004 | Sri Lanka, India | None | None | |
| 03F | December 10 | Not specified | 1006 | None | None | None | |
| Dolphin (Ulysses) | December 11–20 | 120 (75) | 970 | Papua New Guinea, Hawaii, Wake Island, Marshall Islands, Mariana Islands, Micronesia | ≤ $9,000 | 47 | |
| Cinda | December 13–24 | 95 (60) | 985 | None | None | None | |
| Billy | December 17–28 | 175 (110) | 950 | Northwestern Australia | Unknown | 1 | |
| 04U | December 21–24 | 55 (35) | 1000 | Northern Territory | None | None | |
| 05U | December 23–28 | 35 (25) | 1003 | None | None | None | |

== Global effects ==
| Season name | Areas affected | Systems formed | Named storms | Damage (USD) | Deaths |
|---|---|---|---|---|---|
| 2008 Atlantic hurricane season | The Bahamas, East Coast of the United States, Gulf Coast of the United States, Midwestern United States, Eastern Canada, Bermuda, Antillean Islands, Hispaniola, Cuba, Mexico, Central America, Venezuela, Cabo Verde Islands, Senegal, Azores, ABC Islands, San Andrés and Providencia | 17 | 16 | ≥ $49.855 billion | 1,073 |
| 2008 Pacific hurricane season | Central America, Baja California Peninsula, Southwestern Mexico, Yucatán Peninsula, Socorro Island, Hawaii, California, Arizona, Clarion Island | 19 | 17 | $152.2 million | 46 |
| 2008 Pacific typhoon season ^{3} | Palau, Philippines, Taiwan, Japan, China, Vietnam, Thailand, Laos, North Korea, South Korea, Siberia, Myanmar, Cambodia | 41 | 25 | $5.97 billion | 1,965 |
| 2008 North Indian Ocean cyclone season | Andaman and Nicobar Islands, Bangladesh, Myanmar, Thailand, Laos, Yunnan, Oman, India, Yemen, Sri Lanka | 10 | 4 | ~ $15.3 billion | 138,927 |
| 2007–08 South-West Indian Ocean cyclone season ^{2} | Madagascar, Mauritius, Mozambique, Tromelin Island, Réunion, Rodrigues | 8 | 7 | ≥ $38.051 million | 122 |
| 2008–09 South-West Indian Ocean cyclone season ^{3} | Madagascar, Comoros, Chagos Archipelago, Tromelin Island | 4 | 3 | Unknown | 1 |
| 2007–08 Australian region cyclone season ^{2} | Western Australia, Christmas Island | 7 | 5 | Unknown | None |
| 2008–09 Australian region cyclone season ^{3} | Cocos Island, Northwestern Australia, Northern Territory | 5 | 2 | Minor | 1 |
| 2007–08 South Pacific cyclone season ^{2} | Tonga, Niue, Vanuatu, Fiji, New Caledonia, New Zealand | 7 | 4 | ≥ $35 million | 8 |
| 2008–09 South Pacific cyclone season ^{3} | Southern Cook Islands | 3 | 0 | None | 0 |
| 2008 Mediterranean tropical-like cyclone season | Unknown | 3 | 0 | Unknown | Unknown |
| Worldwide | (See above) | 112 (Note: The sum of the number of systems and fatalities in each basin will not equal the number shown as the total. This is because when systems move between basins, it creates a discrepancy in the actual number of systems and fatalities.) | 83 | $294.100 billion | 142,143 |

== Notes ==
^{1} Only systems that formed either on or after January 1, 2008 are counted in the seasonal totals.
^{2} Only systems that formed either before or on December 31, 2008 are counted in the seasonal totals.
^{3} The wind speeds for this tropical cyclone/basin are based on the IMD Scale which uses 3-minute sustained winds.
^{4} The wind speeds for this tropical cyclone/basin are based on the Saffir Simpson Scale which uses 1-minute sustained winds.

== See also ==
- Tropical cyclones by year
- List of earthquakes in 2008
- Tornadoes of 2008
