= Cyclone Hondo =

South-West Indian cyclone in 2008

Intense Tropical Cyclone Hondo
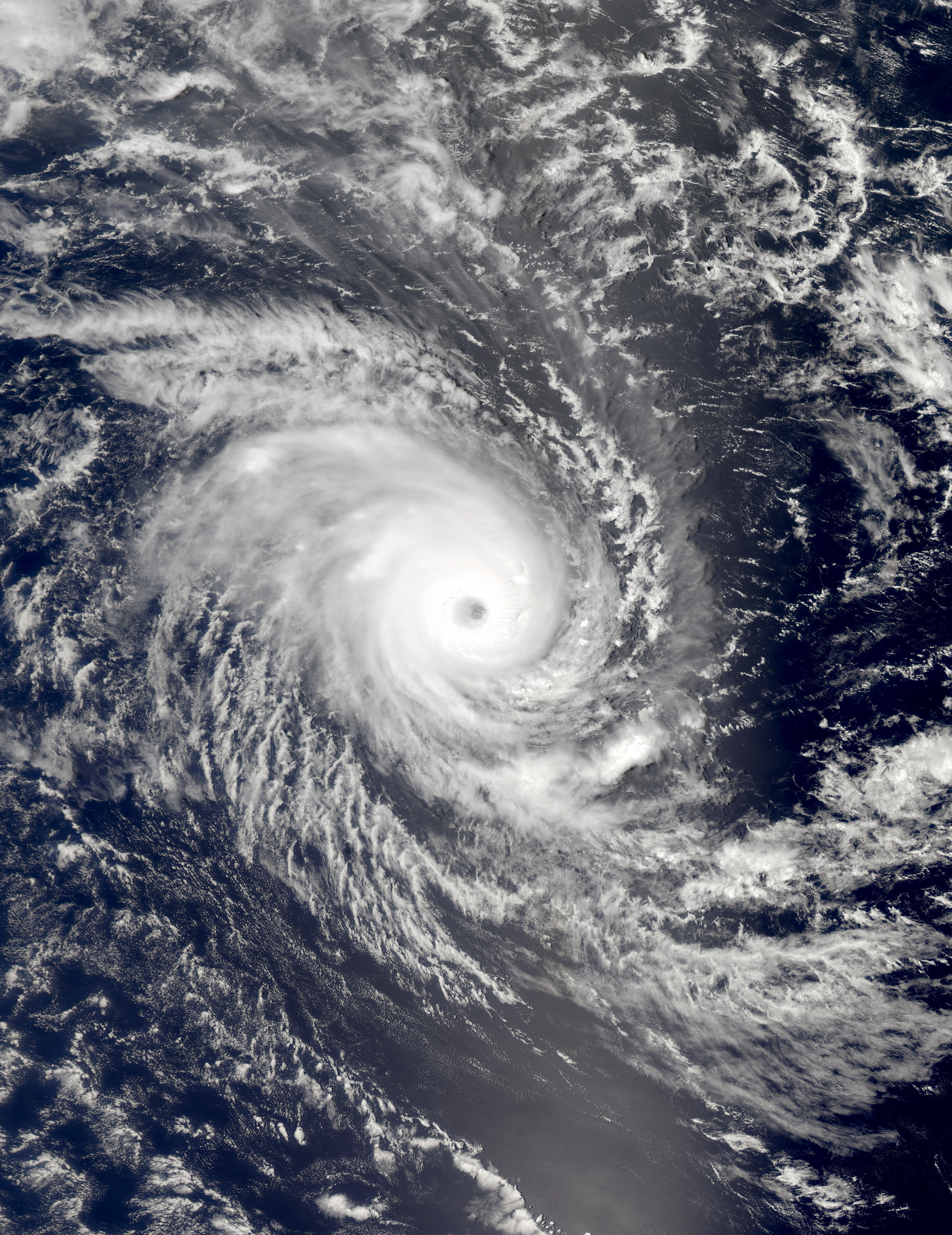
- Cyclone Hondo nearing its peak intensity on 7 February

Meteorological history
- Formed: 2 February 2008
- Dissipated: 29 February 2008

Intense tropical cyclone
- 10-minute sustained (MFR)
- Highest winds: 215 km/h (130 mph)
- Highest gusts: 295 km/h (185 mph)
- Lowest pressure: 915 hPa (mbar); 27.02 inHg

Category 4-equivalent tropical cyclone
- 1-minute sustained (SSHWS/JTWC)
- Highest winds: 240 km/h (150 mph)
- Lowest pressure: 926 hPa (mbar); 27.34 inHg

Overall effects
- Fatalities: None reported
- Damage: Minimal
- Areas affected: Mauritius and Réunion
- IBTrACS
- Part of the 2007–08 South-West Indian Ocean cyclone season

Intense Tropical Cyclone Hondo was the strongest and longest lived tropical cyclone to develop during the 2007–08 South-West Indian Ocean cyclone season. The third tropical cyclone and first intense tropical cyclone of the season, Hondo developed out of a tropical disturbance in early February about 1,020 km (630 mi) east-southeast of Diego Garcia. The disturbance quickly strengthened, becoming a moderate tropical storm on 4 February and a severe tropical storm the following day. After a brief period of slower intensification, Hondo rapidly intensified into an intense tropical cyclone and reached its peak intensity with winds of 215 km/h (134 mph) 10-minute winds) on 7 February. The cyclone gradually weakened over the next several days due to an increase in forward speed and a decrease in sea surface temperatures. On 12 February, Hondo rapidly degenerated into a remnant-low-pressure area. Over the following week, the remnant low traveled in a general west-northwest direction with no development. On 20 February, about 2,780 km (1,730 mi) northeast of where the final advisories were issued, the storm began to regenerate. The next day, advisories were issued on Tropical Disturbance Ex-Hondo, which briefly strengthened into a tropical depression. However, according to the Joint Typhoon Warning Center, Hondo continued to strengthen and attained winds of 95 km/h (59 mph) 1-minute winds) before passing directly over Réunion. Interaction with the island caused the storm to weaken and degenerate into a remnant low once more. The storm dissipated on 29 February after executing a counterclockwise loop.

== Meteorological history ==
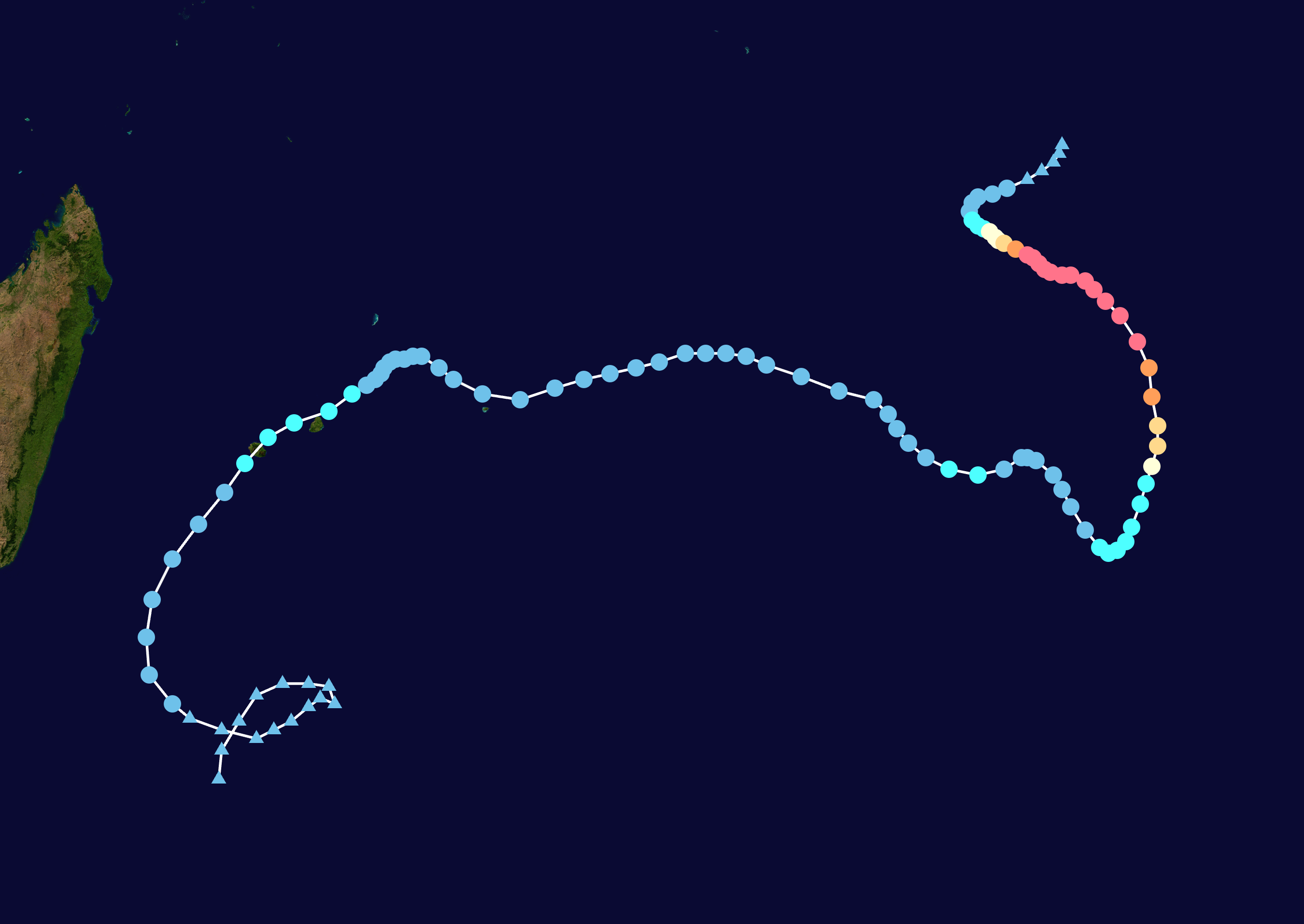
Map plotting the storm's track and intensity, according to the Saffir–Simpson scale Map key Saffir–Simpson scale Tropical depression (≤38 mph, ≤62 km/h) Tropical storm (39–73 mph, 63–118 km/h) Category 1 (74–95 mph, 119–153 km/h) Category 2 (96–110 mph, 154–177 km/h) Category 3 (111–129 mph, 178–208 km/h) Category 4 (130–156 mph, 209–251 km/h) Category 5 (≥157 mph, ≥252 km/h) Unknown Storm type Tropical cyclone Subtropical cyclone Extratropical cyclone, remnant low, tropical disturbance, or monsoon depression

On 2 February, the Regional Specialized Meteorological Centre for the southwest Indian Ocean, Météo-France, and the Joint Typhoon Warning Center (JTWC) began monitoring a tropical disturbance located in the western portion of Météo-France's area of responsibility. However, it was not operationally classified as a disturbance for another two days. Traveling generally towards the southwest, the disturbance slowly strengthened. At 0300 UTC on 4 February, the JTWC issued a Tropical Cyclone Formation Alert for the system as deep convection and outer bands developed around the center. Located within a narrow area of low to moderate wind shear, the system traveled towards the west-southwest at 15 km/h (9.3 mph). Shortly after, Météo-France began issuing advisories on Tropical Disturbance 10 while it was located about 1,020 km (630 mi) east-southeast of Diego Garcia. A buoy located just to the south of the small circulation recording decreasing atmospheric pressure, having lowered by 4 hPa (mbar) in the past 24 hours.

With weak steering currents provided by an area of high pressure to the north, the disturbance slowly moved towards the east-southeast. At 1500 UTC, the JTWC began issuing advisories on the disturbance which they designated as Tropical Cyclone 16S. With high oceanic heat content, low wind shear, and good divergence aloft, significant strengthening was likely. Early the next day, Météo-France upgraded the disturbance to a tropical depression as winds increased to 55 km/h (34 mph) 10-minute winds). However, in the post-season analysis, Météo-France determined that the system had become a depression about 12 hours earlier and was already a moderate tropical storm by the time of the operation upgrade. At 0600 UTC, Météo-France classified the depression as a moderate tropical storm and was given the name Hondo; a name submitted to the World Meteorological Organization by Zimbabwe. It was later determined that Hondo was already a severe tropical storm by the time it was named operationally.

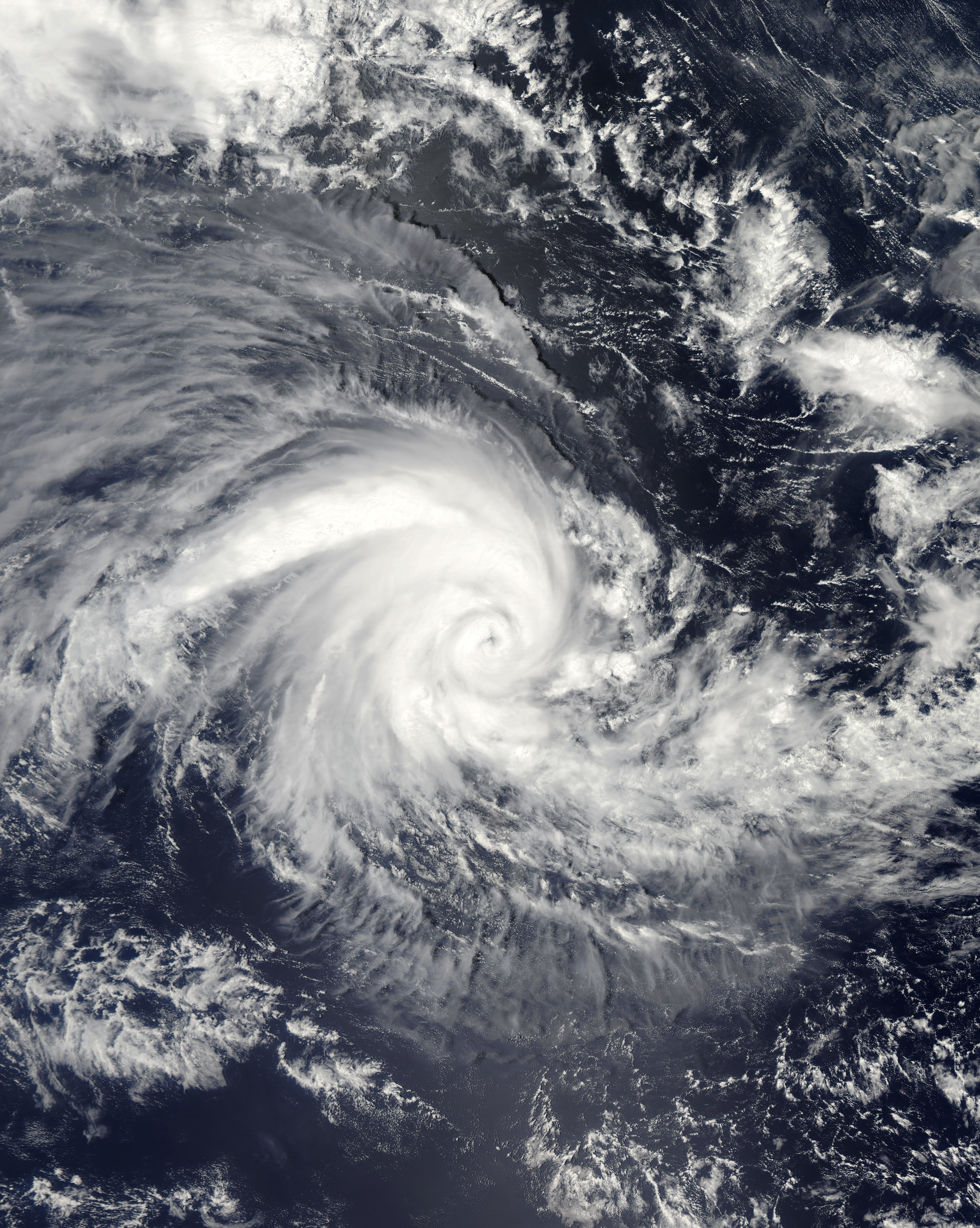
Cyclone Hondo strengthening on 5 February

Hondo continued to quickly strengthen, becoming a tropical cyclone, the equivalent of a Category 1 hurricane on the Saffir–Simpson scale, that same day. After maintaining its through the early hours of 6 February, a pinhole eye began to develop, signifying that Hondo was beginning to undergo rapid intensification. During this intensification phase, the storm became nearly stationary again due to a weakness in the ridge which was previously steering the cyclone towards the east. Later that day, Hondo was upgraded to an intense tropical cyclone with winds of 175 km/h (109 mph) 10-minute winds). After becoming an intense tropical cyclone, wind shear began to increase, causing the eye to become slightly disorganized, temporarily slowed the intensification. Later in the day, the eye became better defined, allowing Hondo to intensify further. Operationally, Hondo was upgraded to a very intense tropical cyclone with winds of 220 km/h (140 mph) 10-minute winds) with a minimum pressure of 906 hPa (mbar). However, after reanalysis, it was found that Hondo never intensified beyond intense tropical cyclone status and winds peaked at 215 km/h (134 mph) 10-minute winds) with a minimum pressure of 915 hPa (mbar).

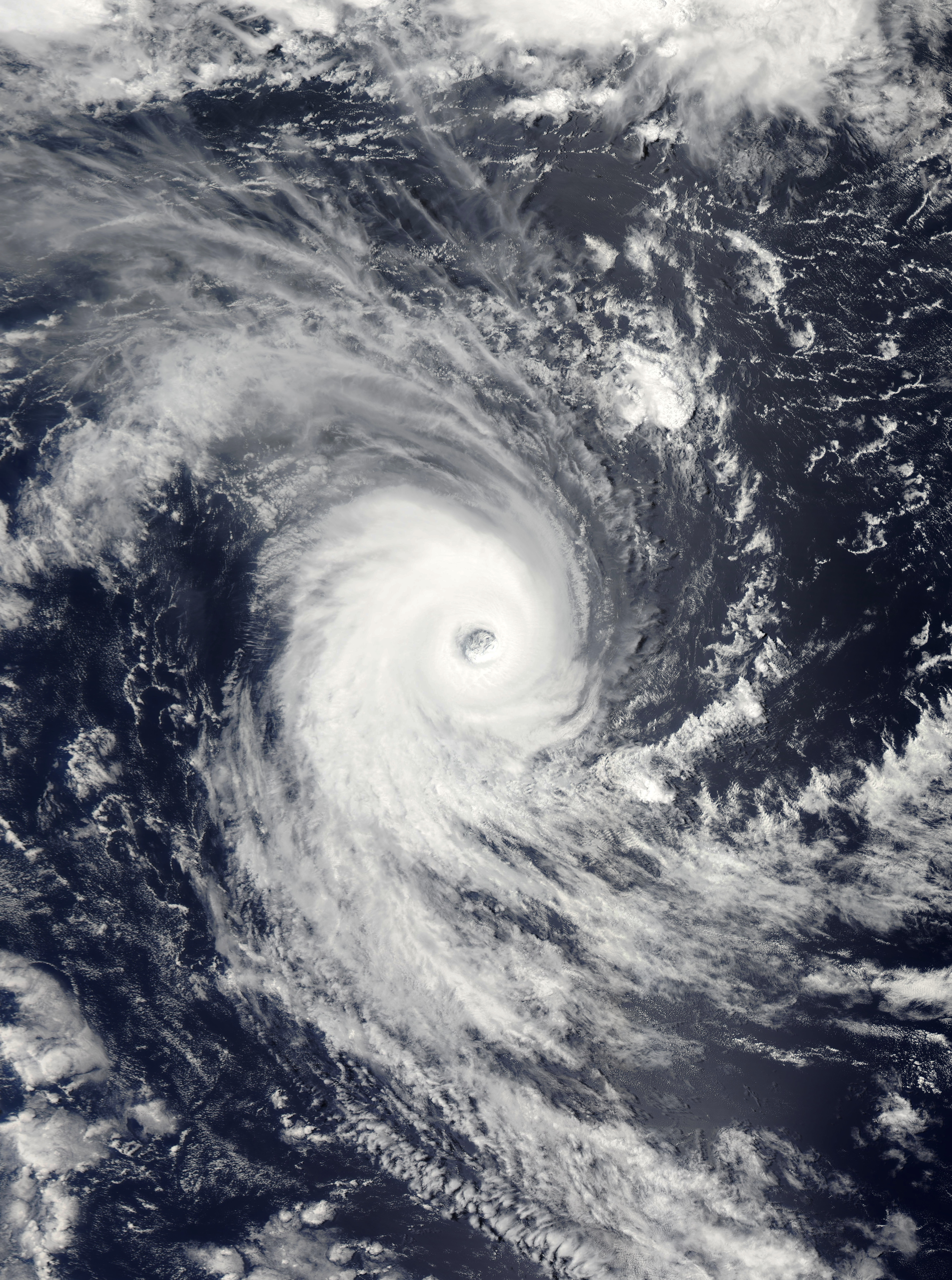
Cyclone Hondo on 9 February

Around the same time that Météo-France assessed Hondo to have peaked, the JTWC reported that the storm had attained winds of 230 km/h (140 mph) 1-minute winds), equivalent to a strong Category 4 hurricane. Shortly after reaching peak intensity, the cloud tops around the eye began to warm, meaning that the storm was beginning to weaken. Hondo also turned towards the southwest and kept a steady pace as two subtropical highs began influencing its movement. The storm continued to weaken as cloud tops warmed but remained an intense tropical cyclone as its eye was still well-defined. Hondo briefly re-intensified later on 8 February despite the structure of the storm deteriorating. The cyclone maintained intense tropical cyclone status through 10 February due to the formation of a large eye which helped maintain the storms structure. Hondo gradually began to weaken due to a combination of decreasing sea surface temperatures and increasing forward motion. On 10 February, Hondo started a gradual curving path due to a trough located to the south and strengthening high-pressure systems to the north. At 0600 UTC, the storm was downgraded to a tropical cyclone as winds decreased to 155 km/h (96 mph).

Continued weakened led to the storm being downgraded to a severe tropical storm early on 11 February as it tracked towards the southeast. After spending several hours over cold waters, most of the convection associated with Hondo dissipated due to the lack of energy and the storm was further downgraded to a moderate tropical storm. Later that day, no convection remained around the storm as it weakened to a tropical depression. The JTWC issued their final advisory on 12 February as the storm showed no signs of convective activity. Hondo degenerated into a remnant-low-pressure area as Météo-France issued their final advisory at 1200 UTC. For the next week, the remnant low traveled in a general west-northwestward direction with little or no development. On 20 February, about 2,780 km (1,730 mi) northeast of where the final advisories were issued, the low began to develop weak convection around the northern edge of the center of circulation.

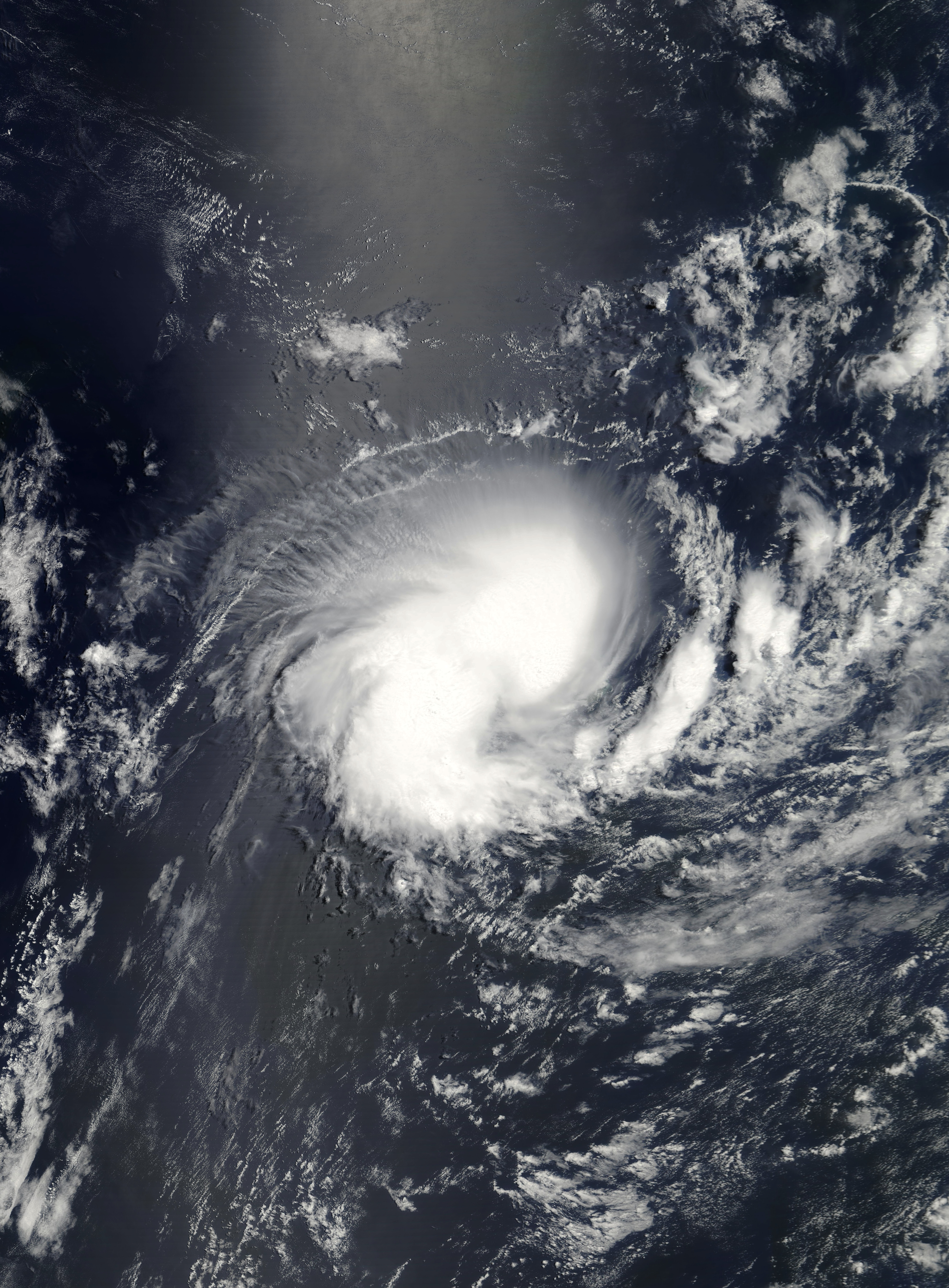
Ex-Hondo near Mauritius and Réunion on 23 February

On 21 February, Météo-France began to issue advisories on Tropical Disturbance Ex-Hondo which presented a well-defined circulation. Later that day, deep convection redeveloped around the center as the low entered an area favorable for development. At 0830 UTC, the JTWC issued a Tropical Cyclone Formation Alert, stating that Hondo was likely to regenerate into a tropical cyclone. Later that day, Hondo became almost stationary and was upgraded to a tropical depression as it continued to develop. The next day, Hondo was downgraded to a tropical disturbance as wind shear constrained convective development and caused the system to weaken. However, early on 23 February, the JTWC began issuing advisories on Hondo as they estimated winds to have reached 65 km/h (40 mph) once more. At 0600 UTC, Hondo attained winds of 95 km/h (59 mph) 1-minute winds) near Mauritius and Réunion. Due to the proximity to the islands, convection associated with the storm became disorganized and it began to weaken. The JTWC issued their final advisory early on 24 February as the system significantly weakened, with the center devoid of convection. Météo-France issued their final advisory several hours later. The remnants of Hondo persisted for another five days, executing a counterclockwise loop before dissipating on 29 February.

== Preparations and impact ==
As Hondo began to regenerate, Mauritius and Réunion were placed under a state of alert. Residents in Réunion were advised to stay up to date with the latest warnings on the storm, not go hiking in the mountains, ensure their disaster kit is fully stocked, stay away from the shore, and know the locations of the nearest shelters. Initially, residents in Madagascar feared that Hondo would make landfall in the country after being struck by Cyclone Ivan on 16 February. However, the storm turn towards the southwest, away from Madagascar. On 23 February, ex-Hondo tracked just offshore Mauritius before passing directly over Réunion, just short of moderate tropical storm status. Sustained winds of 50 km/h (31 mph) with gusts up to 76 km/h (47 mph) were recorded on Mauritius while sustained winds of 55 km/h (34 mph) with gusts up to 99 km/h (62 mph) were recorded on Réunion. The highest rainfall total was recorded at Takamaka, totaling to 750 mm (30 in). Up to 760,000 people were affected on Réunion and overall damage was minimal.

== See also ==
- Tropical cyclones in 2008
- Tropical cyclones in the Mascarene Islands
