= 2007–08 South Pacific cyclone season =

Tropical cyclone season

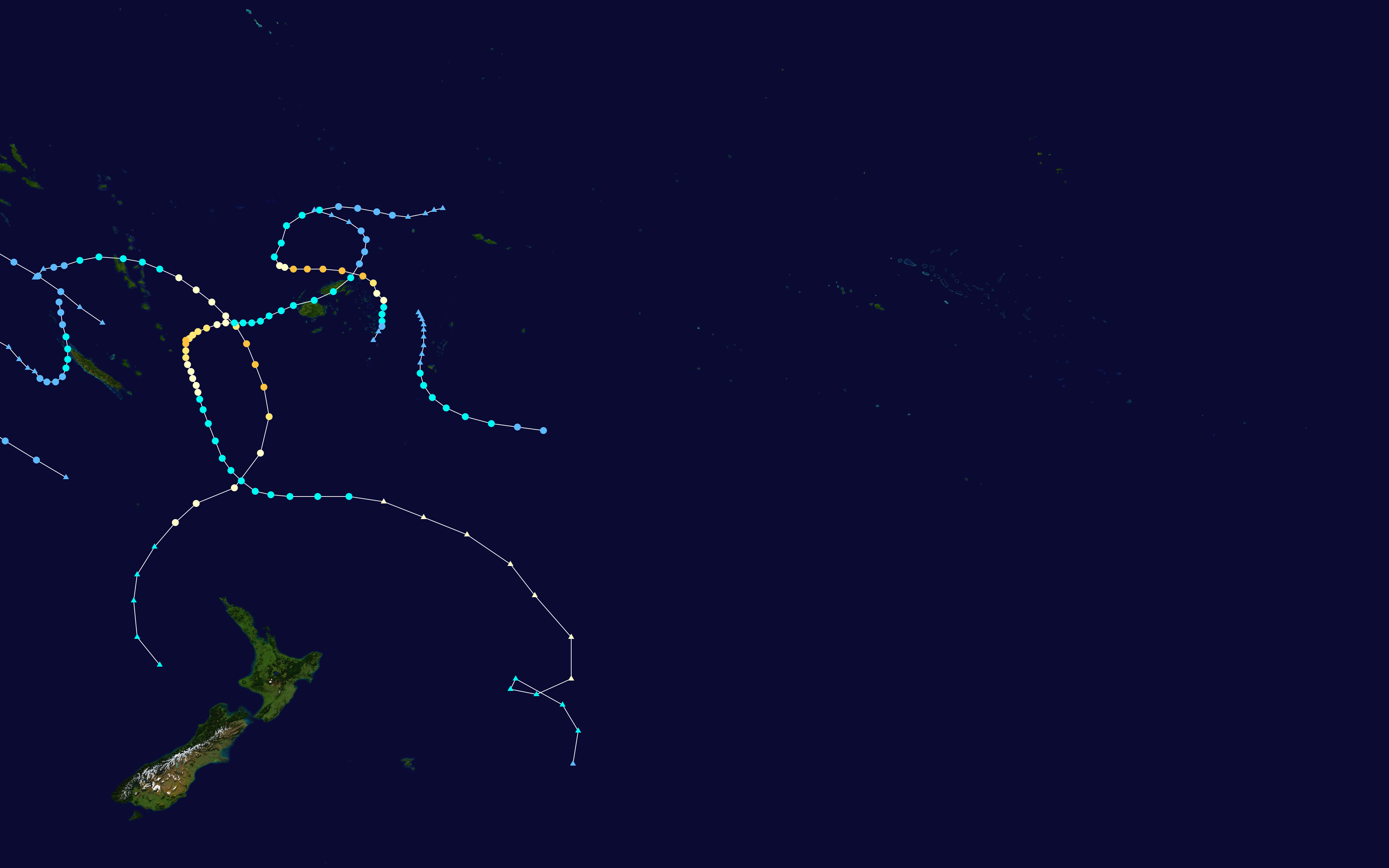
- Season summary map

Seasonal boundaries
- First system formed: October 17, 2007
- Last system dissipated: April 19, 2008

Strongest storm
- Name: Daman
  - Maximum winds: 185 km/h (115 mph) (10-minute sustained)
  - Lowest pressure: 925 hPa (mbar)

Seasonal statistics
- Total disturbances: 16
- Total depressions: 15
- Tropical cyclones: 4
- Severe tropical cyclones: 3
- Total fatalities: 5 direct, 3 indirect
- Total damage: $46 million (2008 USD)

Related articles
- Timeline of the 2007–08 South Pacific cyclone season; 2007–08 South-West Indian Ocean cyclone season; 2007–08 Australian region cyclone season

The 2007–08 South Pacific cyclone season was one of the least active South Pacific tropical cyclone seasons on record, with only four tropical cyclones occurring within the South Pacific basin to the east of 160°E. The season officially ran from November 1, 2007, until April 30, 2008, although the first cyclone, Tropical Depression 01F, developed on October 17. The most intense tropical cyclone of the season was Severe Tropical Cyclone Daman, which reached a minimum pressure of 925 hPa (27.32 inHg) as it affected Fiji. After the season had ended, the names Daman, Funa, and Gene were retired from the tropical cyclone naming lists.

During the season, tropical cyclones were officially monitored by the Regional Specialized Meteorological Centre (RSMC) in Nadi, Fiji, and the Tropical Cyclone Warning Centre (TCWC) in Wellington, New Zealand. Throughout the season the United States Navy and Air force also monitored the basin and issued unofficial warnings, through its Joint Typhoon Warning Center (JTWC). Tropical cyclones that were located between 160°E and 120°W as well as the Equator and 25°S were monitored by RSMC Nadi while any that were located to the south of 25°S between 160°E and 120°W were monitored by TCWC Wellington. During the season, RSMC Nadi and TCWC Wellington estimated sustained windspeeds over a 10-minute period and used the Australian Tropical Cyclone intensity scale, while the JTWC estimated sustained windspeeds over a 1-minute period with windspeeds compared to the Saffir–Simpson hurricane scale.

== Seasonal forecasts ==
| Source/Record | Season/Date | TC | STC |
|---|---|---|---|
| Average activity (1969–70 – 2005–06) | | 8 | 4 |
| Record high activity | 1997–98 | 16 | 7 |
| Record low activity | 1994–95 | 3 | 1 |
| Activity during the season | | 4 | 3 |

During October 2007, both RSMC Nadi and New Zealand's National Institute of Water and Atmospheric Research (NIWA), issued forecasts for a near to below average season, due to the presence of a weak La Niña event. As a result of these conditions, neither agency predicted how many tropical cyclones would develop but noted that on average 6–8 cyclones could be expected to develop during a weak La Niña season. According to RSMC Nadi, Fiji was likely to be affected by one to two tropical cyclones, while two to three were likely to pass through Fiji's exclusive economic zone. However this prediction was revised in early February, after Daman, Funa and Gene had affected the archipelago. According to NIWA there was an average risk of a tropical cyclone coming within 550 km (340 mi) of Tuvalu, Fiji, Tonga, Tokelau, Wallis and Futuna, and Northern New Zealand, while the risks for the Solomon Islands, Vanuatu, New Caledonia, Samoa and Niue were variable and uncertain. All other islands though faced a reduced risk off being affected by a tropical cyclone.

== Seasonal summary ==
On October 17, RSMC Nadi reported that Tropical Depression 01F had developed about 670 km (420 mi) to the west of the Solomon Islands. Over the next few days, the depression moved slowly towards the east, before RSMC Nadi issued their final advisory on 01F early on October 19, as it had become sheared and had weakened into a tropical low. After 01F weakened into a tropical low-pressure system and dissipated the basin remained quiet until November 20 when Tropical Disturbance 02F developed into a tropical depression. After developing into a tropical depression, 02F remained weak and unorganized before rapidly dissipating during November 22. RSMC Nadi also reported during November 22, that a weak tropical disturbance had developed on the edge of the basin about 280 km (175 mi) to the south of Honiara, on the Solomon Island of Guadalcanal.

== Systems ==
=== Tropical Depression 02F ===
- Tropical depression (Australian scale)
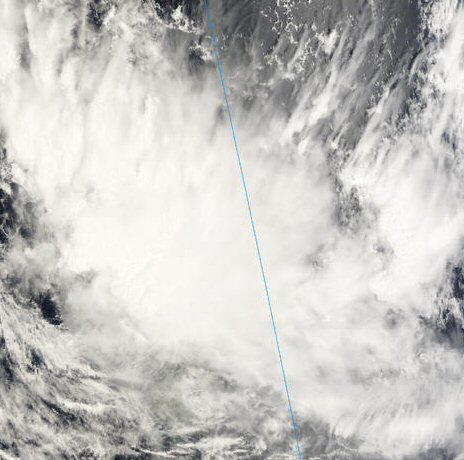
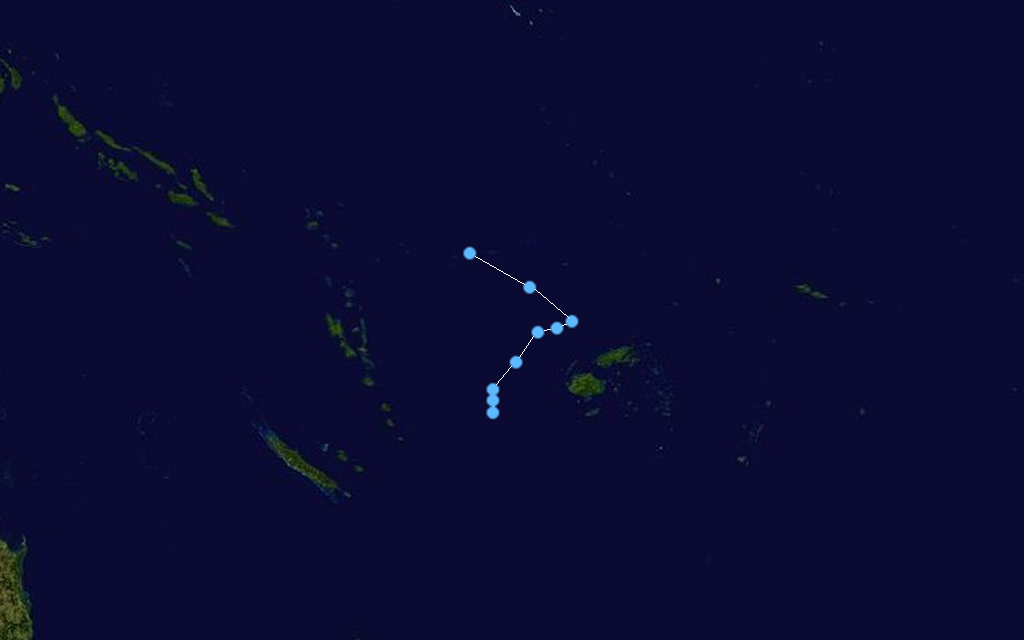
- Duration: November 20 – November 22
- Peak intensity: Winds not specified; 1001 hPa (mbar)

Tropical Disturbance 02F developed within the South Pacific convergence zone on November 20, about 900 km (560 mi) to the northeast of Suva, Fiji. During that day the disturbance moved towards the south and slightly developed further before it was designated as Tropical Depression 02F. However convection surrounding the system was poorly organized and remained so over the next couple of days, as it moved southwards into an area of high vertical windshear and cooler sea surface temperatures. The depression was subsequently last noted on November 22, as it dragged a convergence zone over Fiji which led to an episode of significant widespread rain and brought fresh to strong winds to Fiji.

=== Tropical Depression 03F ===
- Tropical depression (Australian scale)
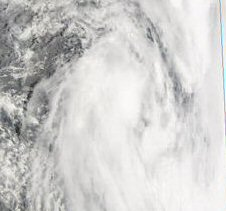
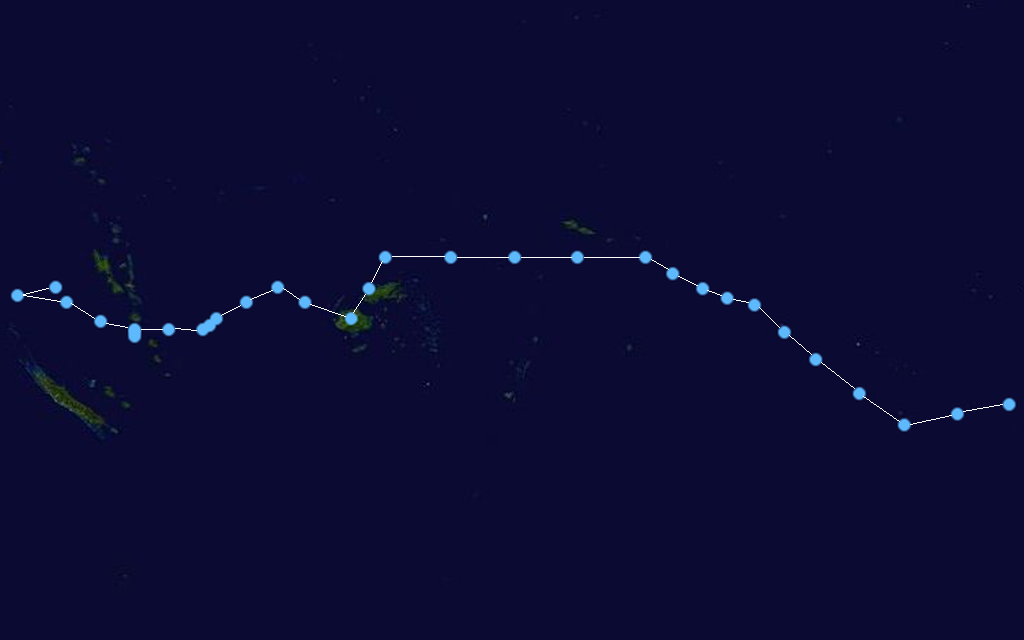
- Duration: November 22 – December 2
- Peak intensity: Winds not specified; 999 hPa (mbar)

On November 22, RSMC Nadi reported that a weak tropical disturbance had developed on the edge of the basin, about 285 km (175 mi) to the south of Honiara on the Solomon Island of Guadalcanal. Over the next couple of days the depression moved towards the east and gradually developed further before RSMC Nadi designated it as Tropical Disturbance 03F on November 24, while it was located about 400 km (250 mi) to the northeast of Port Vila on the Vanuatuan island of Efate. During that day the disturbance continued to move eastwards before later that day, RSMC Nadi reported that 03F had developed into a tropical depression.

=== Severe Tropical Cyclone Daman ===
- Category 4 severe tropical cyclone (Australian scale)
- Category 3 tropical cyclone (SSHWS)
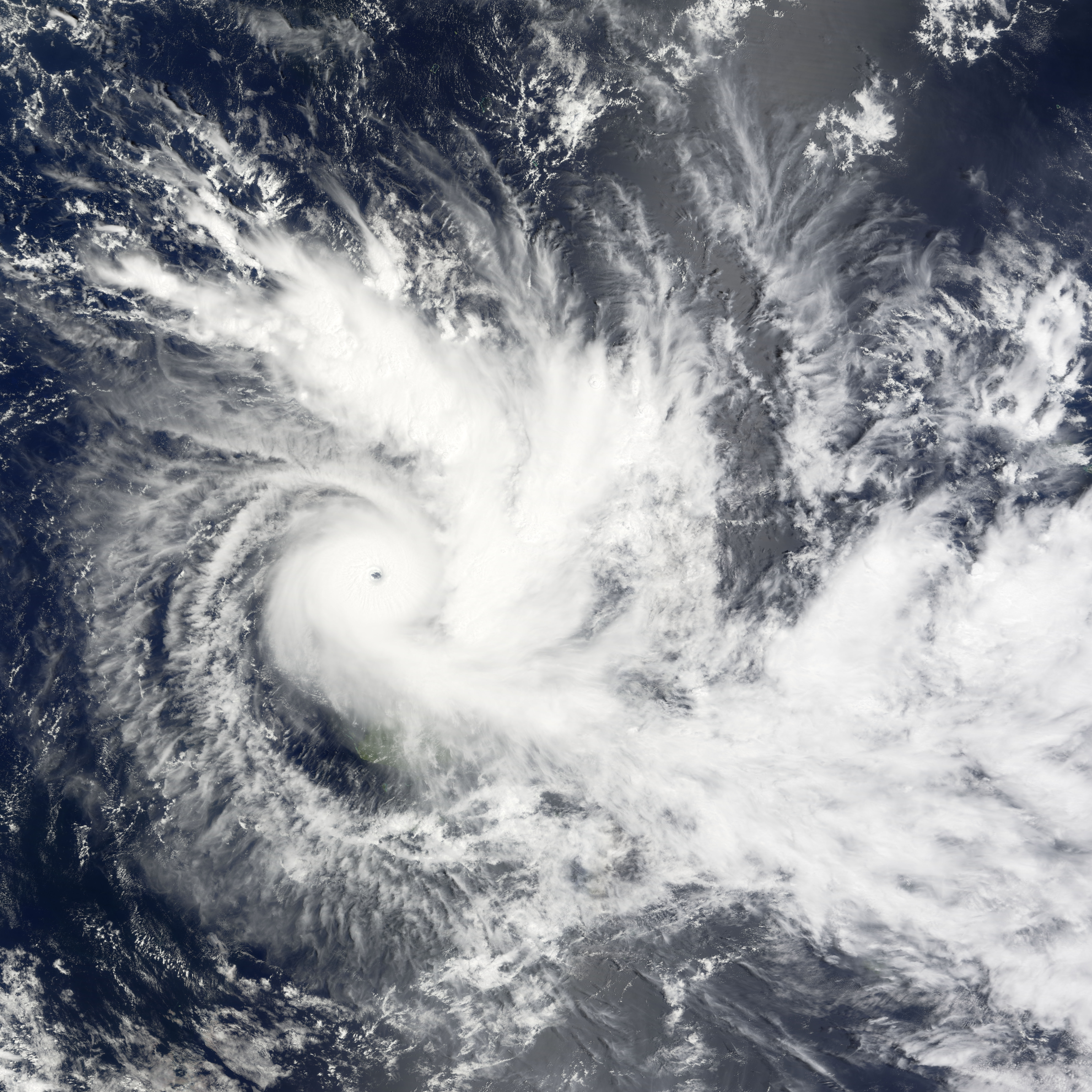
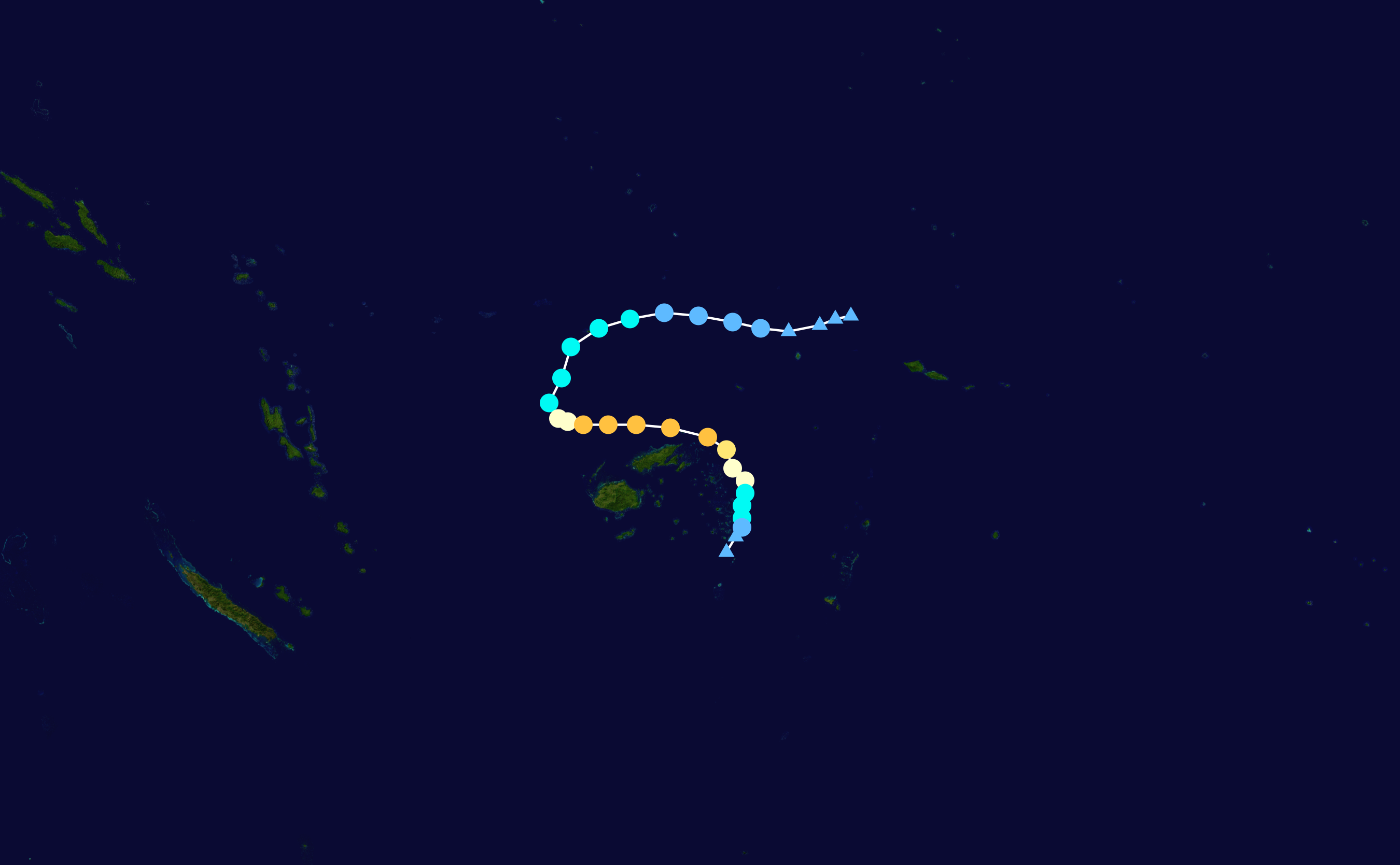
- Duration: December 3 – December 10
- Peak intensity: 185 km/h (115 mph) (10-min); 925 hPa (mbar)

Cyclone Daman was the strongest cyclone of the season. On December 3, the Regional Specialized Meteorological Centre (RSMC) in Nadi, Fiji, upgraded a tropical disturbance, located to the west of the Solomon Islands, to Tropical Depression 04F. On December 5, as the depression moved towards the west into the Fijian archipelago, both the Joint Typhoon Warning Center (JTWC) and RSMC Nadi upgraded it to Cyclone Daman. On December 7 the cyclone reached its peak intensity with winds of 185 km/h, (115 mph 10-minute sustained) which made Daman a Category 4 cyclone on the Australian Tropical Cyclone Intensity Scale. Later that day Daman also reached its peak intensity by 1-minute means with winds of 205 km/h (125 mph) which made it a Category 3 tropical cyclone on the Saffir–Simpson hurricane scale. Early on December 8, Cyclone Daman brushed by the Fijian island of Cikobia, causing damage to housing, crops and vegetation. Daman then weakened the next day into a tropical depression and dissipated on December 10.

=== Tropical Depression 05F ===
- Tropical depression (Australian scale)
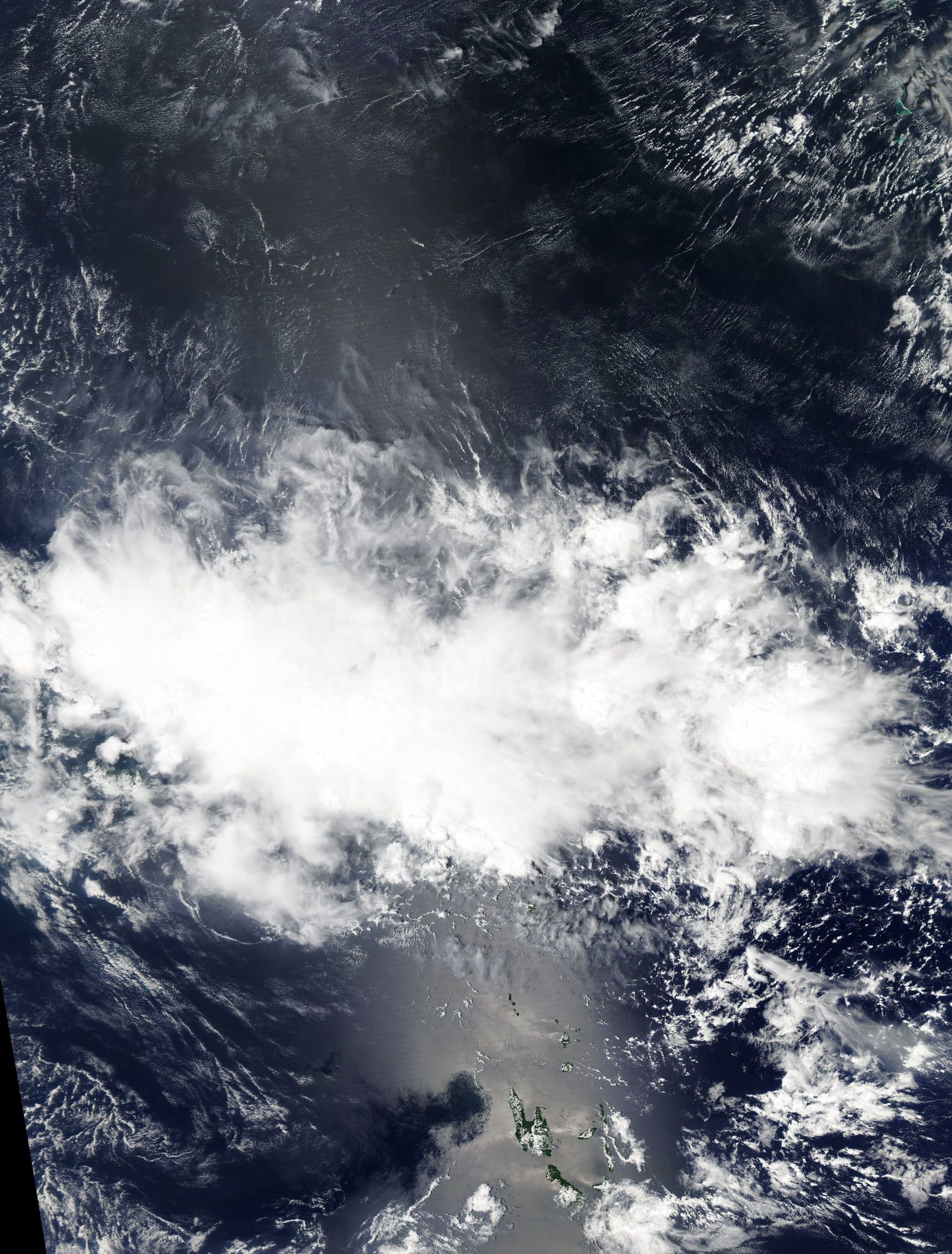
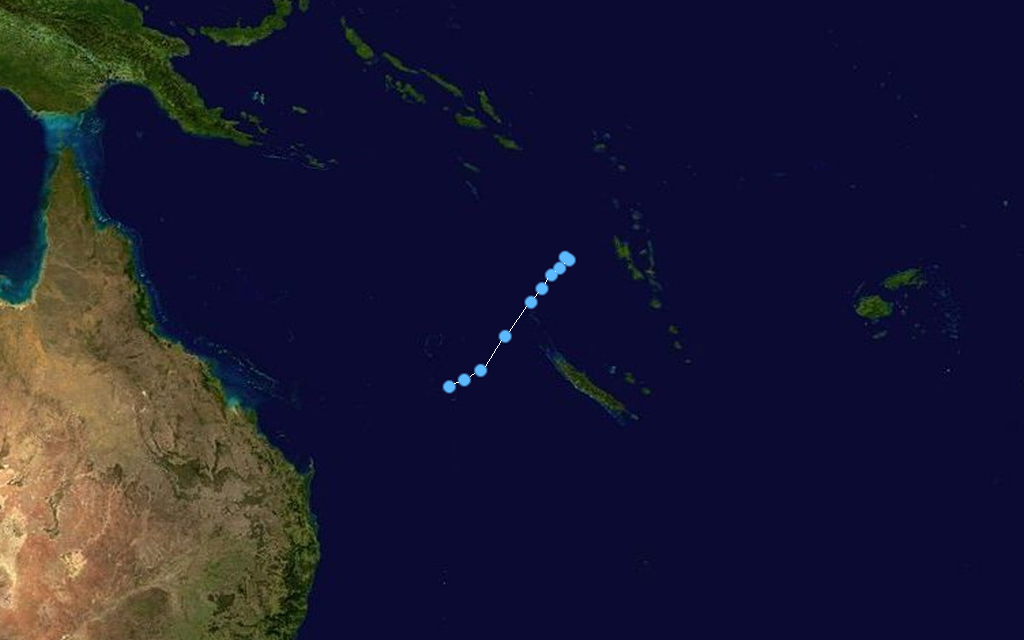
- Duration: December 11 – December 14
- Peak intensity: 55 km/h (35 mph) (10-min); 1000 hPa (mbar)

Early on December 11, RSMC Nadi reported that Tropical Depression 05F had developed within a surface trough, about 670 km (415 mi) to the northeast of Apia on the Samoan Island of Upolu. The depression was embedded within a convergence zone and had 10-minute sustained windspeeds of 55 km/h (35 mph) to 65 km/h (40 mph). Convection surrounding the depression was not organized and was only active within the northern and eastern quadrants. Over the next few days RSMC Nadi issued special weather bulletins for the Southern Cook Islands as 05F and an intense high-pressure system were forecast to produce gale-force winds over several of the Cook Islands. The depression was then last noted by RSMC Nadi on December 14, as it and the high-pressure system started to weaken after causing gale-force winds, flooding and significant swells.

=== Tropical Disturbance 06F ===
- Tropical disturbance (Australian scale)
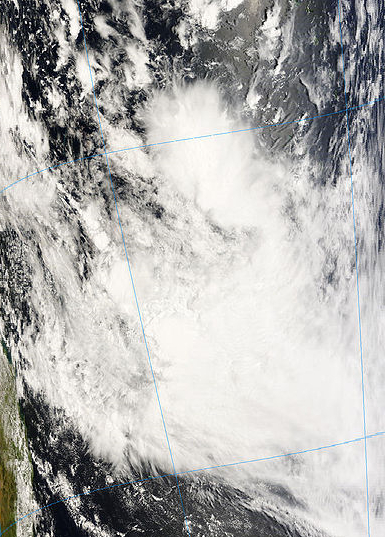
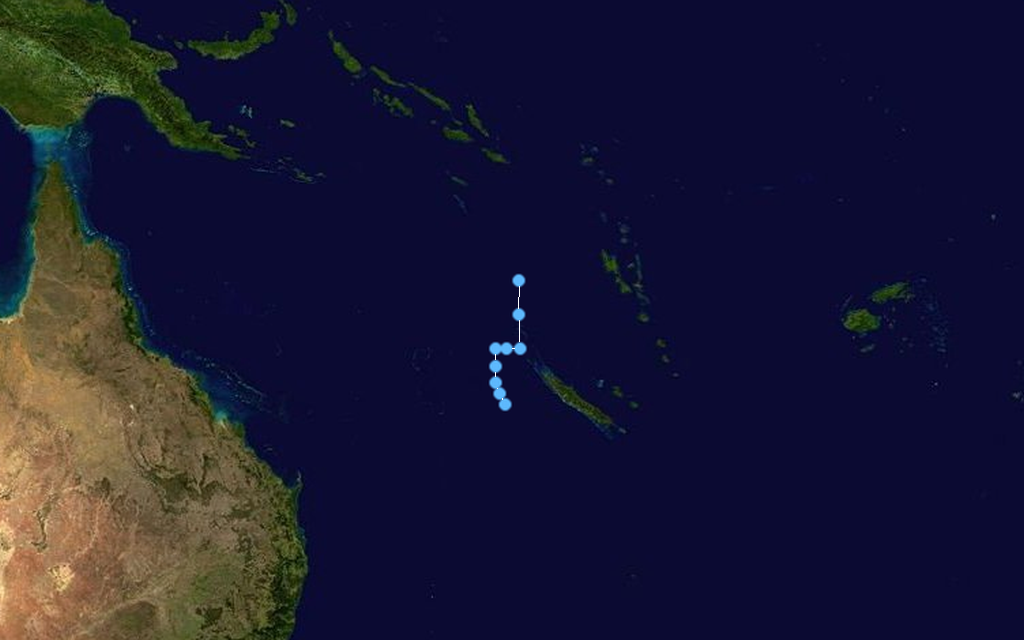
- Duration: December 26 – December 28
- Peak intensity: 35 km/h (25 mph) (10-min); 1006 hPa (mbar)

On December 26, RSMC Nadi reported that Tropical Disturbance 06F had developed about 680 km (420 mi) to the northeast of Avarau on the Southern Cook Island of Rarotonga in an area of high vertical windshear. Over the next couple of days, the system moved towards the south and convection surrounding the system remained unorganized, while the low level circulation centre was detached from the convection and became exposed. The disturbance was last noted by RSMC Nadi on December 28, as it approached TCWC Wellington's area of responsibility.

=== Tropical Cyclone Elisa ===
- Category 2 tropical cyclone (Australian scale)
- Tropical storm (SSHWS)
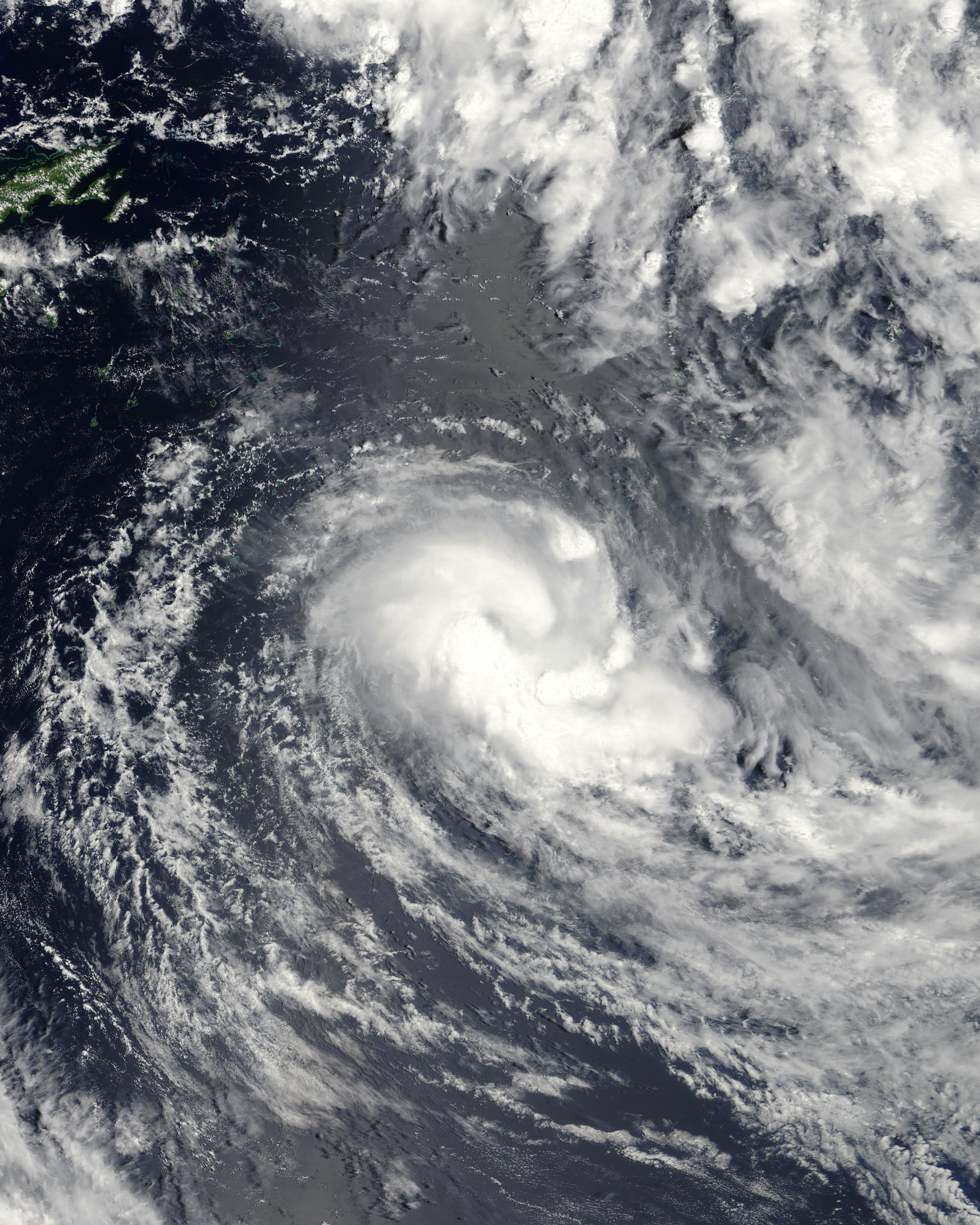
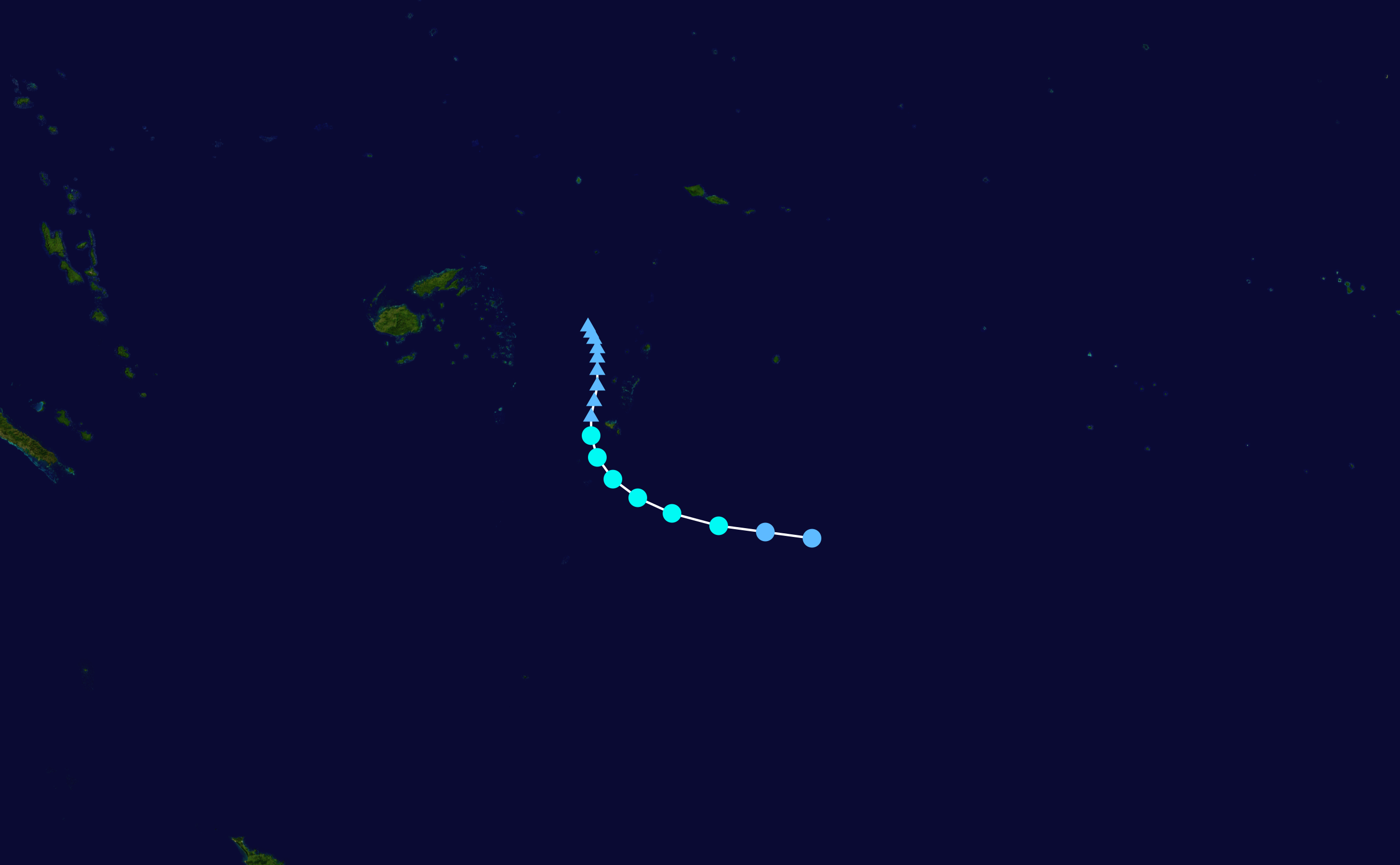
- Duration: January 7 – January 11
- Peak intensity: 95 km/h (60 mph) (10-min); 980 hPa (mbar)

At 1800 UTC on January 7, RSMC Nadi reported that a poorly organized Tropical Depression 07F, had developed within a slow moving trough of low pressure about 600 km (370 mi), to the east of Suva, Fiji. The JTWC then started to monitor 07F during January 8 and reported that convection was displaced to the south of the systems well defined low level circulation center, however an upper-level low was preventing convection directly forming over the center. Over the next couple of days, the depression slowly developed further as it moved towards the south in an area of hostile vertical windshear. RSMC Nadi and the JTWC then reported at 0000 UTC on January 10, that 07F had developed into a tropical cyclone with RSMC Nadi naming it Elisa while located about 55 km (35 mi) to the southwest of Nukuʻalofa, Tonga. During that day as windshear relaxed, Elisa intensified further, before RSMC Nadi and the JTWC reported at 1800 UTC that the cyclone had reached its peak sustained windspeeds of 95 km/h (60 mph), equivalent to a tropical storm and a category 2 tropical cyclone. During January 11, Elisa recurved towards the southeast into a region of cooler waters and stronger windshear, as a result the cyclone weakened into a depression, with RSMC Nadi and the JTWC issuing their final advisories later that day.

Elisa brought heavy rain to Tonga and Niue, and damaged several fruit-bearing trees in Tongatapu and Eua. High seas and a high surf moved several small vessels and fishing boats ashore in Nukuʻalofa.

=== Tropical Depression 08F ===
- Tropical depression (Australian scale)
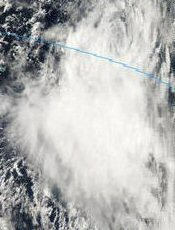
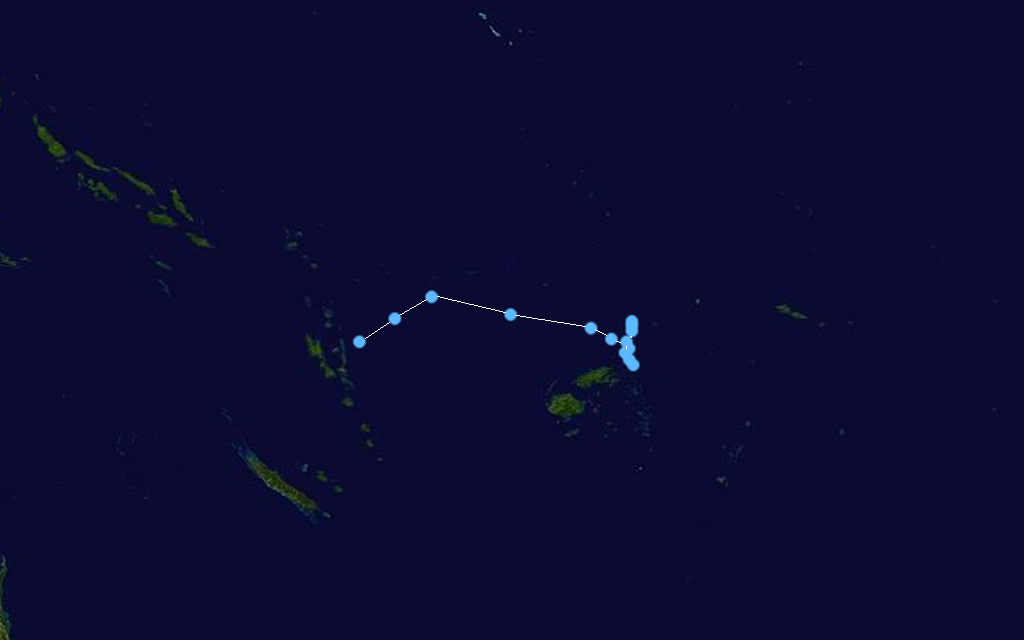
- Duration: January 9 – January 14
- Peak intensity: 45 km/h (30 mph) (10-min); 998 hPa (mbar)

On January 9, RSMC Nadi designated a low-pressure area northeast of Vanuatu as Tropical Depression 08F. The depression moved eastwards over the next few days but did not intensify any further. RSMC Nadi then downgraded the depression to a tropical disturbance early on January 14 and then released their final tropical disturbance summary.

=== Severe Tropical Cyclone Funa ===
- Category 4 severe tropical cyclone (Australian scale)
- Category 3 tropical cyclone (SSHWS)
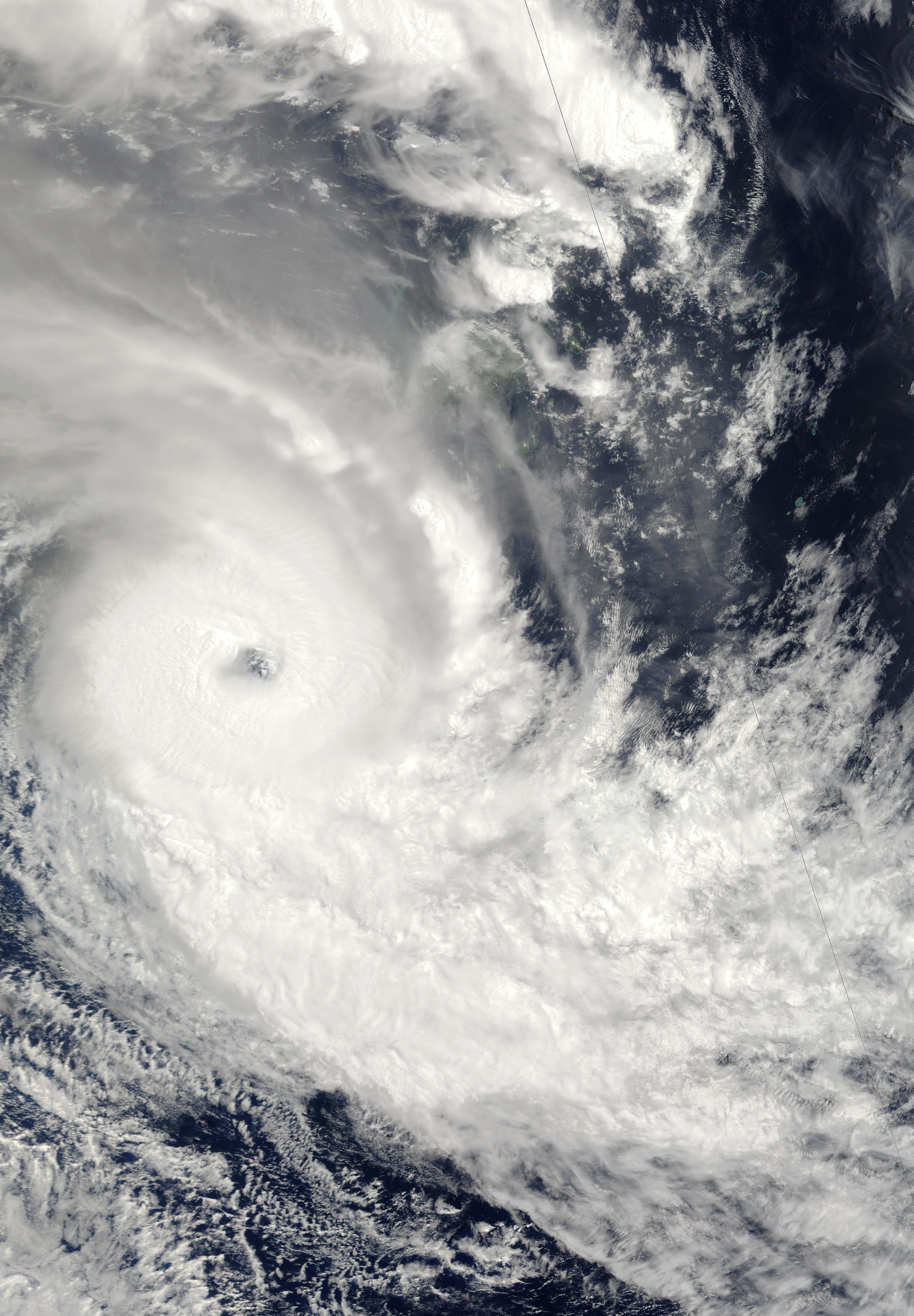
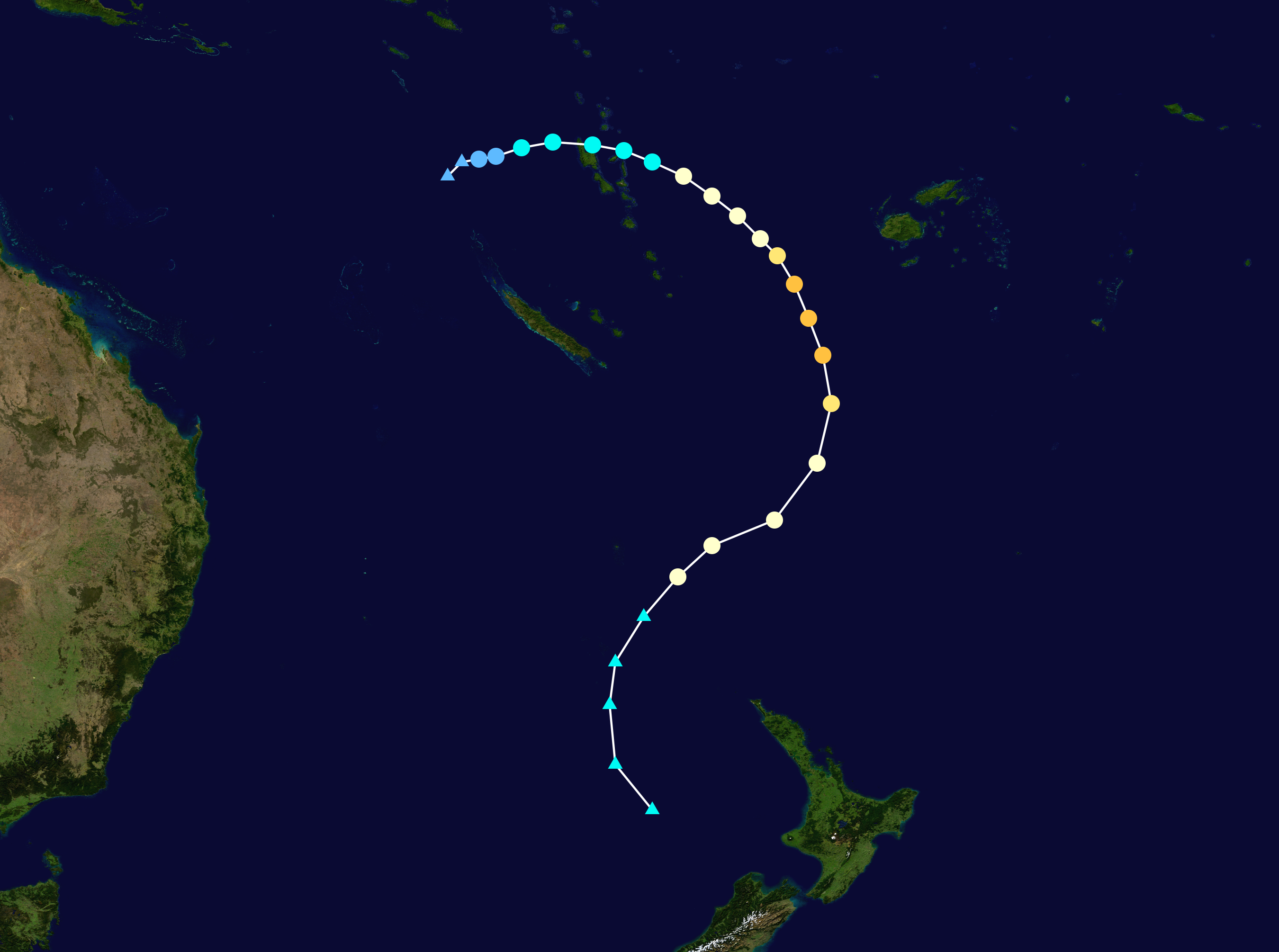
- Duration: January 15 – January 21
- Peak intensity: 175 km/h (110 mph) (10-min); 930 hPa (mbar)

On February 15, RSMC Nadi and the JTWC reported that a tropical depression had developed within a monsoon trough, about 700 km (435 mi) to the northeast of Port Vila on the Vanuatuan island of Efate. During that day the depression moved eastwards and gradually developed further, before as vertical windshear slackened a little, the JTWC and RSMC Nadi reported that the depression had developed into a tropical cyclone with the later naming it as Funa at 0600 UTC on February 16.

It then started to move eastwards and passed very near the next day to the northern tip of Aurora Island, Vanuatu with wind speeds of 55 knots (102 km/h) which made Funa a category two cyclone on the Australian scale.

After leaving Vanuatu, Funa intensified slowly becoming a Category 3 severe Tropical cyclone on January 18 and then early the next day it reached its peak wind speeds of 95 knots (176 km/h) which is the same as a category 4 cyclone according to the Southern Pacific Cyclone Scale. The JTWC measured Funa's peak winds at 105 knots (194 km/h). The storm then moved into TCWC Wellington area of responsibility it started to weaken and then became extra tropical the next day with the JTWC issuing their final advisory on January 20, with TCWC Wellington downgrading it to a low later that day.

=== Tropical Depression 11F ===
- Tropical depression (Australian scale)
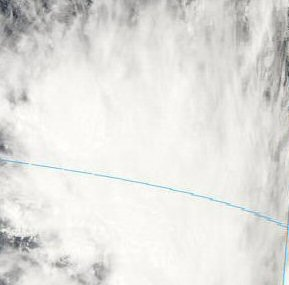
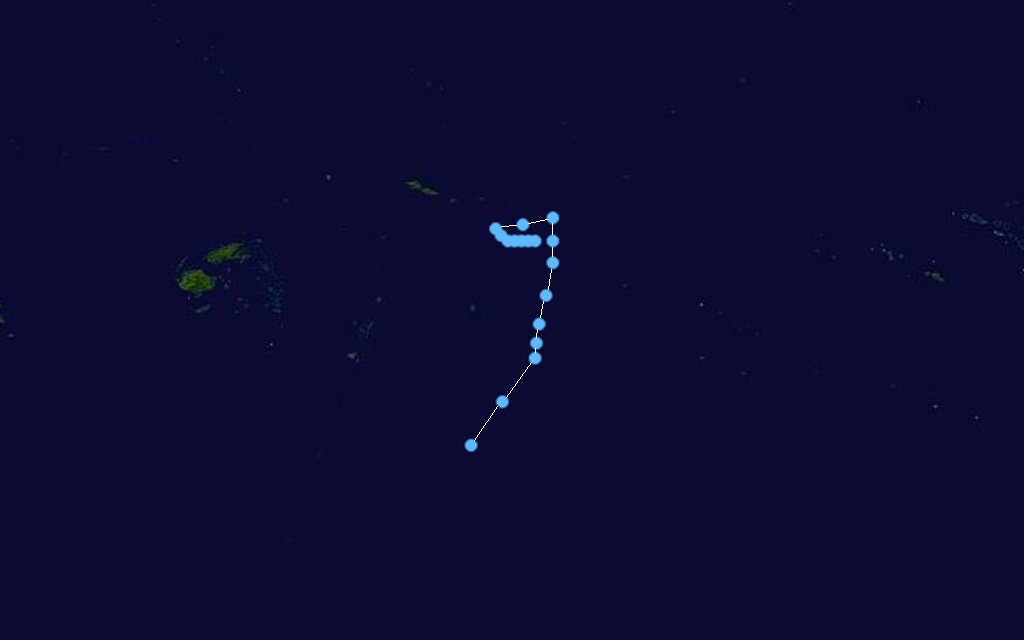
- Duration: January 19 – January 24
- Peak intensity: 75 km/h (45 mph) (10-min); 999 hPa (mbar)

RSMC Nadi identified a Tropical Disturbance in the southern Central Pacific Ocean located to the east of Pago Pago on January 19 and started to issue summaries on it. The next day it intensified into a tropical depression and was designated the number 11F by RSMC Nadi. However the tropical depression did not strengthen any further as it moved southwards towards the edge of RSMC Nadi's area of responsibility with TCWC Wellington. Late on January 23 RSMC Nadi issued its last warnings on 11F as the depression had moved into TCWC Wellingtons area of responsibility. However the next day the system became extratropical as it was about southwest of Tonga'tapu.

=== Severe Tropical Cyclone Gene ===
- Category 3 severe tropical cyclone (Australian scale)
- Category 3 tropical cyclone (SSHWS)
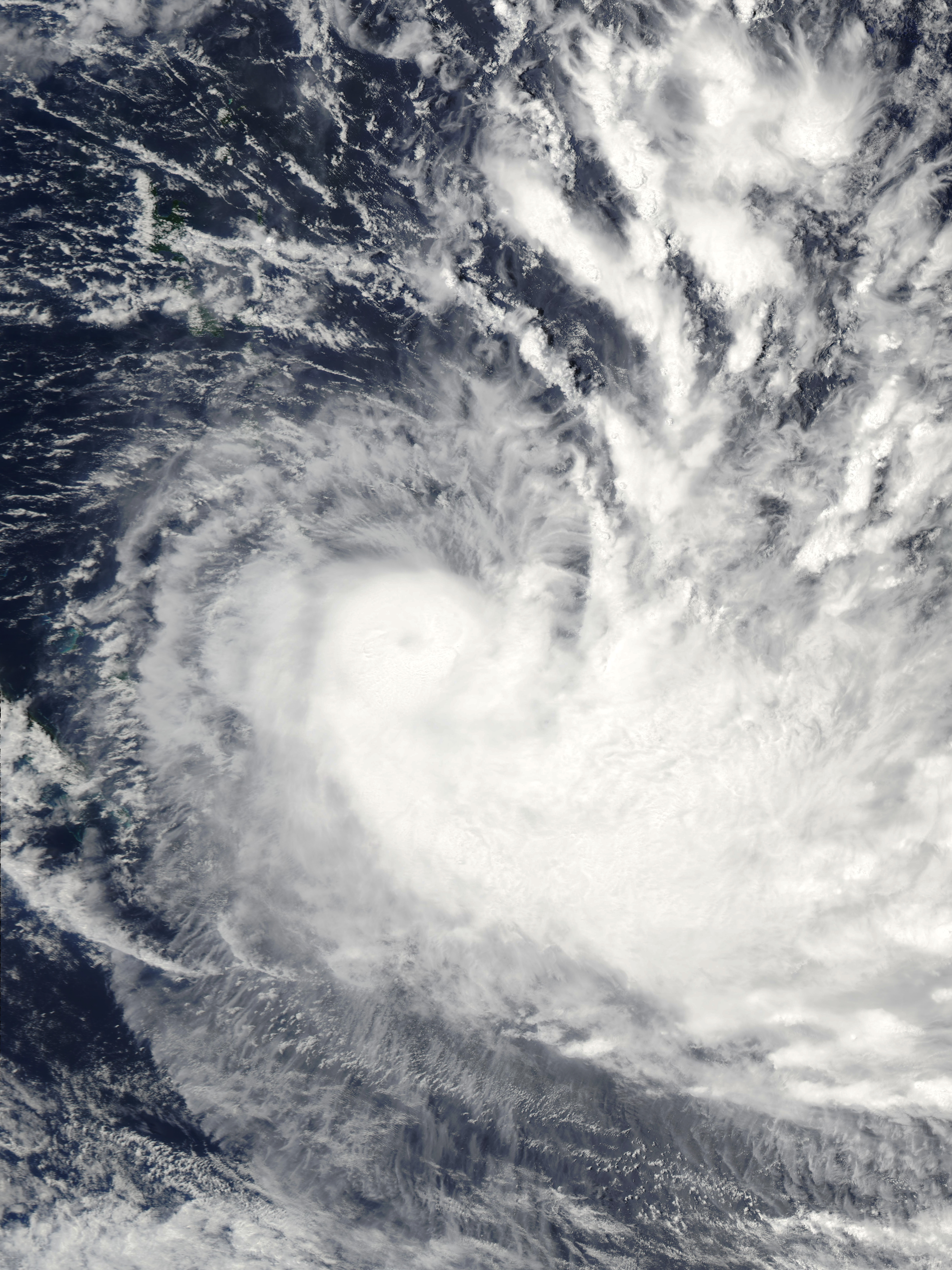
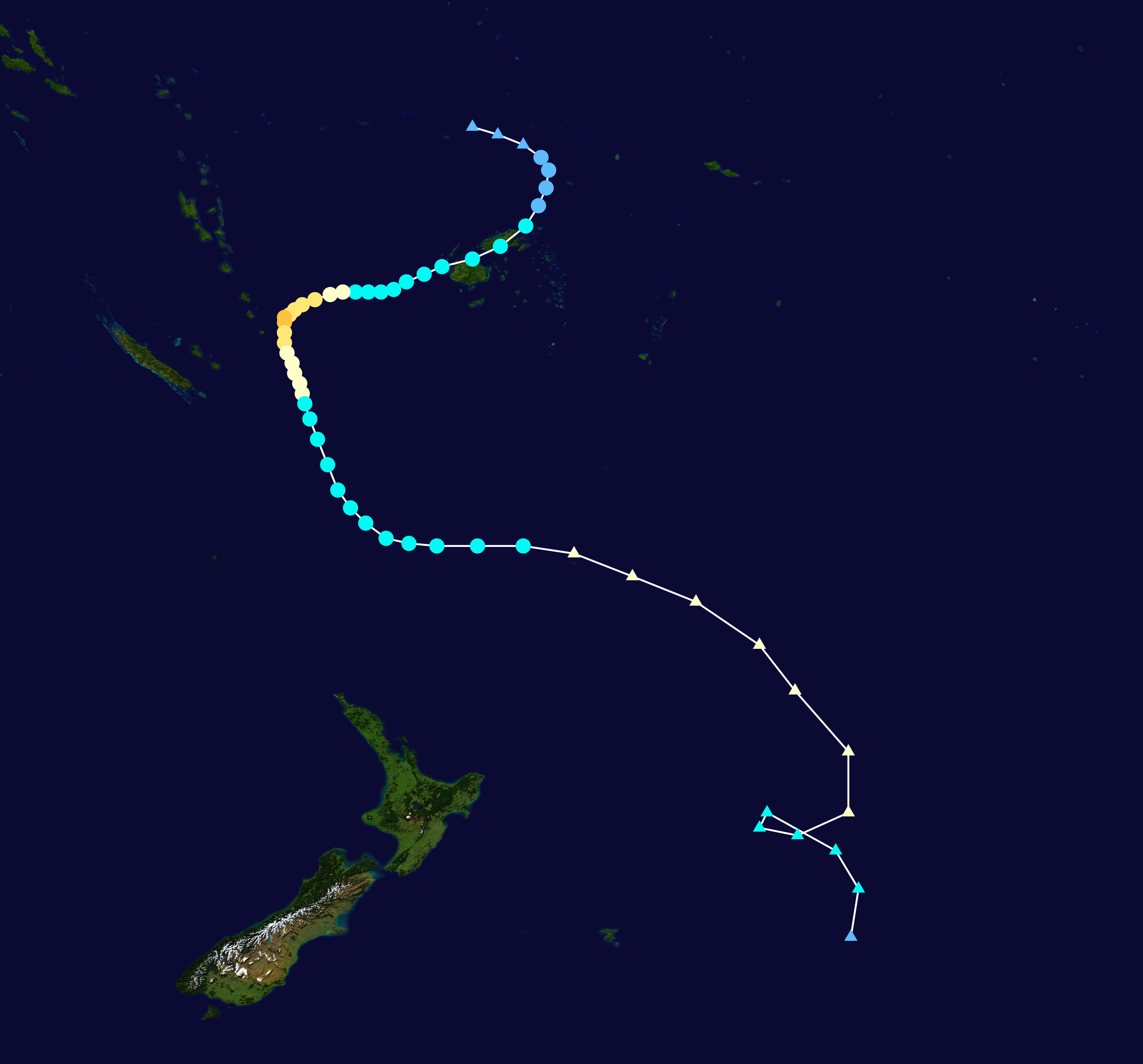
- Duration: January 26 – February 6
- Peak intensity: 155 km/h (100 mph) (10-min); 945 hPa (mbar)

On January 26, RSMC Nadi and the JTWC started to monitor a weak tropical disturbance that had developed within a monsoon trough about 290 km (180 mi) to the northeast of Rotuma. The disturbance initially moved towards the southeast before it recurved and started to move towards the southwest and Fiji during the next day, while gradually developing further in an area of low vertical windshear. At 1800 UTC on January 27, the JTWC reported that the disturbance had developed into Tropical Cyclone 15P, while it moved towards the southwest and hugged Vanua Levu's southeastern coast, under the influence of a ridge of high pressure that was located to the southeast of the system. 15P's development was hindered while it was located over land, however it did not weaken significantly because it was located in an area of favourable upper-level conditions. As the centre of 15P emerged into and passed over the Bligh Waters, convection erupted around the system and for humanitarian reasons, RSMC Nadi named the system, Gene at 0000 UTC on January 28, before 6 hours later reporting that Gene had become a Category 1 tropical cyclone.

During that day the newly named cyclone, moved towards the west-southwest across the Bligh Water, before it made landfall near Lautoka, Viti Levu, as a Category 1 tropical cyclone. After it emerged back into the Pacific Ocean Gene intensified slowly. becoming a Category 3 severe tropical cyclone on January 30. Gene then reached its peak winds of 150 km/h (95 mph) the next day. On February 1, Gene began to weaken becoming a Category 2 cyclone with wind speeds of 100 km/h (60 mph). It kept this intensity until it had crossed 25°S and had moved into TCWC Wellington's Area of responsibility, when Gene intensified back into a severe tropical cyclone. Gene then slowly weakened with JTWC reporting that Gene had become an extra tropical cyclone on February 6. TCWC Wellington then released their final advisory on February 9.

Cyclone Gene caused widespread damage to several of Fiji's main islands, including Viti Levu, Vanua Levu, Taveuni, Yasawa, Mamanuca, and other outlying island groups, and killed 8 people. The cyclone also caused severe damage to Vanautu's Futuna island after its outer bands lashed the island with gale-force windspeeds and heavy rain for 12 hours.

=== Tropical Depression 14F ===
- Tropical depression (Australian scale)
- Tropical storm (SSHWS)
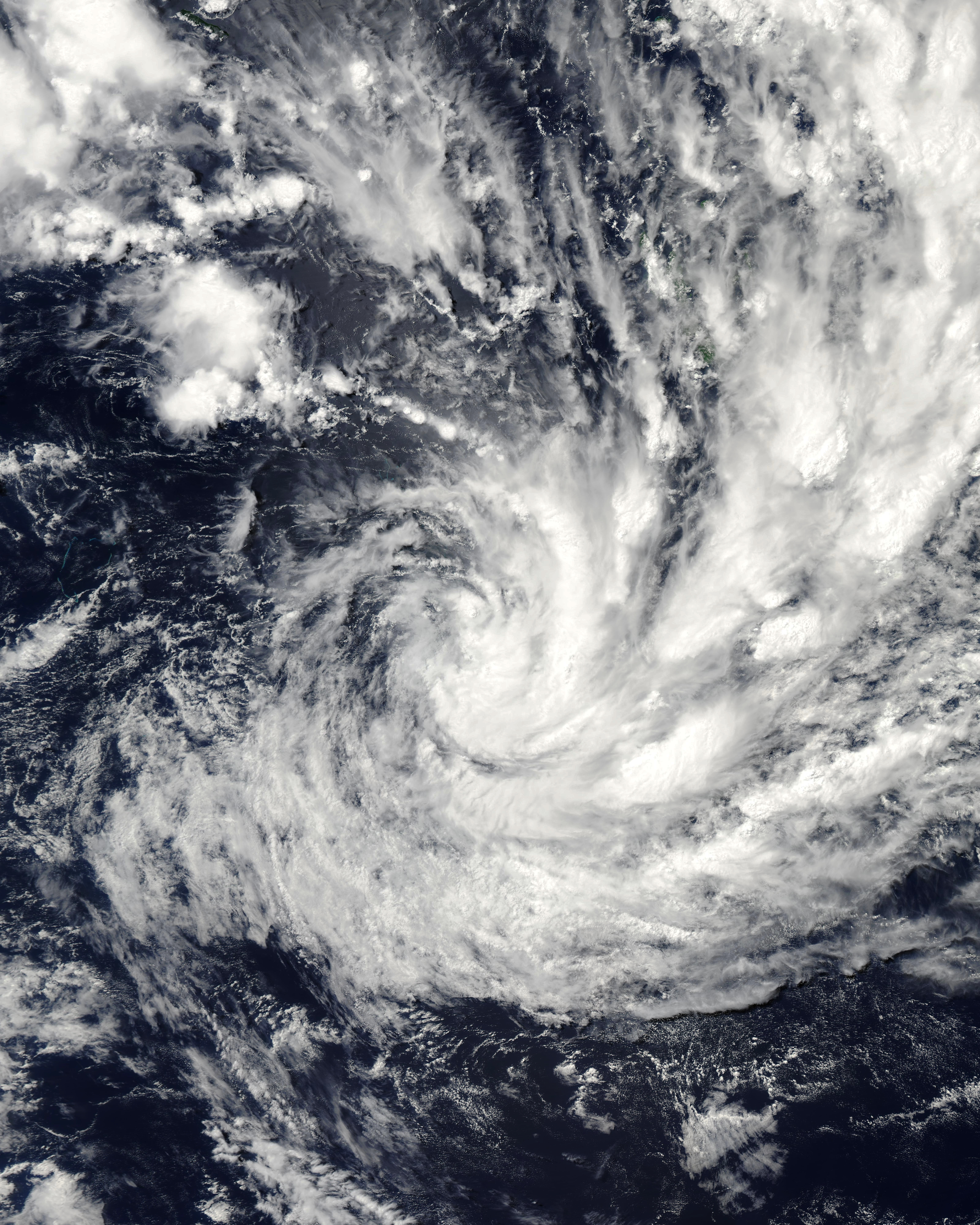
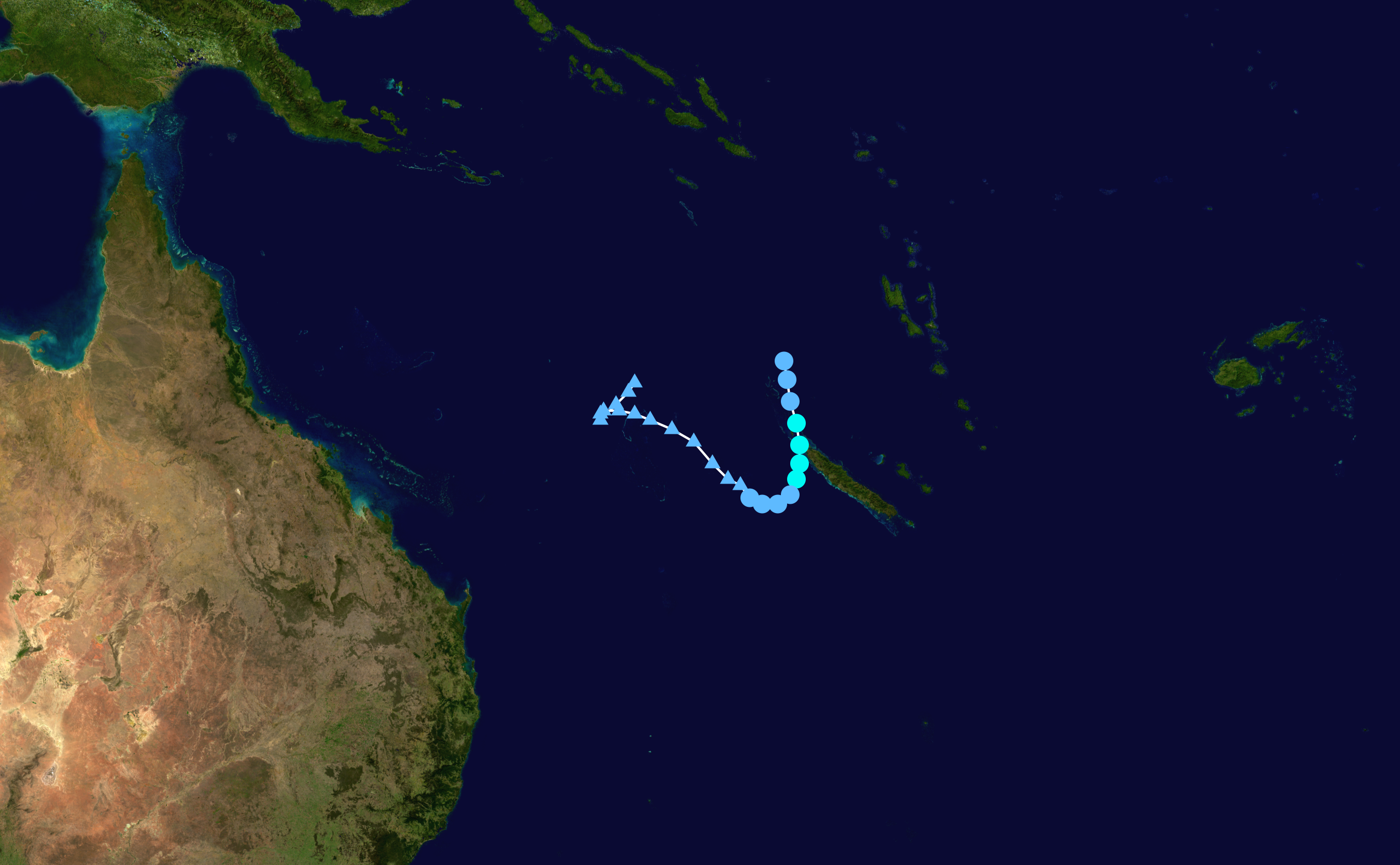
- Duration: March 19 – March 23
- Peak intensity: 55 km/h (35 mph) (10-min); 998 hPa (mbar)

On March 19, an area of disturbed weather west of Vanuatu, was designated as Tropical Disturbance 14F by RSMC Nadi. Later that day 14F had intensified enough to be upgraded to a tropical depression by RSMC Nadi. The next day the Joint Typhoon Warning Center (JTWC) issued a Tropical Cyclone Formation Alert on the depression. Later that day the JTWC initiated advisories on the depression designating it as Tropical Cyclone 24P. The Tropical Depression then reached its peak wind speeds of 30 knots (56 km/h) that day. On March 21, The Depression encountered an unfavourable environment of moderate to high vertical wind shear and weakened with the JTWC issuing its final advisory that day. Early on March 22 RSMC Nadi downgraded Tropical Depression 14F to Tropical Disturbance 14F and then the next day issued their last advisory on the tropical disturbance.

=== Tropical Depression 15F ===
- Tropical depression (Australian scale)
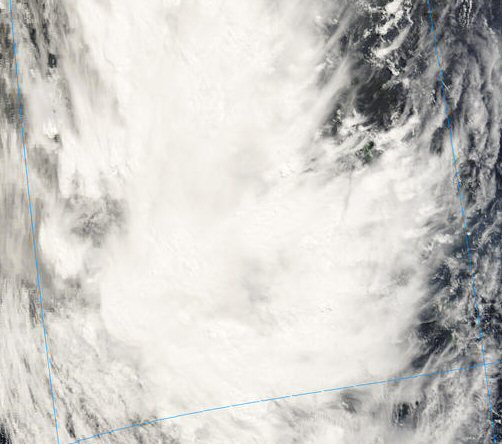
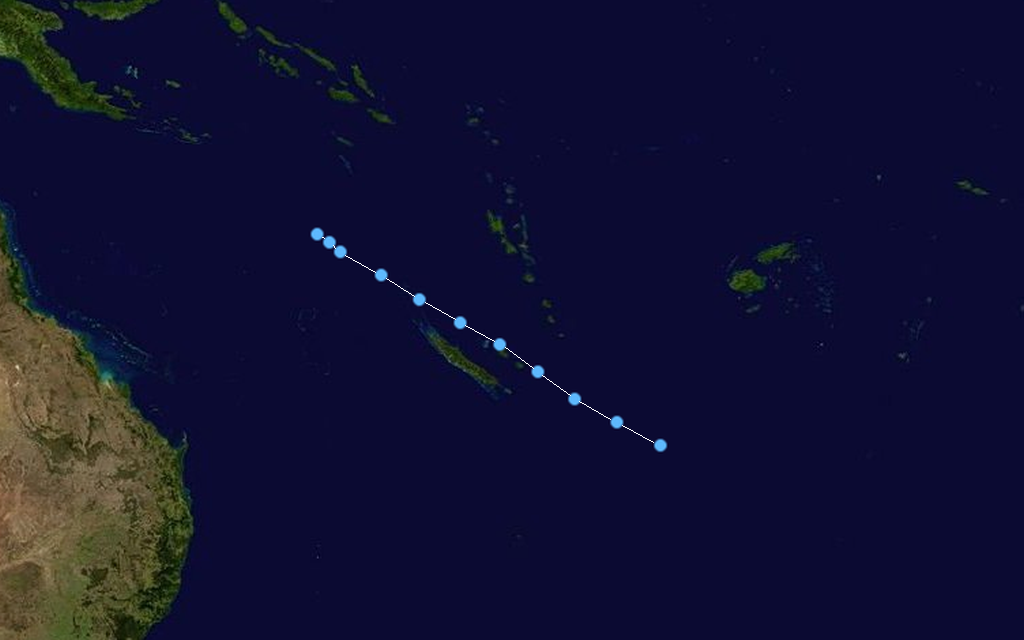
- Duration: April 4 – April 7
- Peak intensity: 45 km/h (30 mph) (10-min); 1002 hPa (mbar)

On April 4, RSMC Nadi reported that Tropical Disturbance 15F had developed within the Australian region, about 415 km (260 mi) to the north-northeast of New Caledonia's Chesterfield Islands. During that day as the system moved into the South Pacific basin, it developed into a tropical depression. The system subsequently moved south-eastwards and passed between Vanuatu and New Caledonia, before it was last noted on April 7, while it was located about 750 km (465 mi) to the northeast of Norfolk Island.

=== Tropical Depression 16F ===
- Tropical depression (Australian scale)
- Tropical depression (SSHWS)
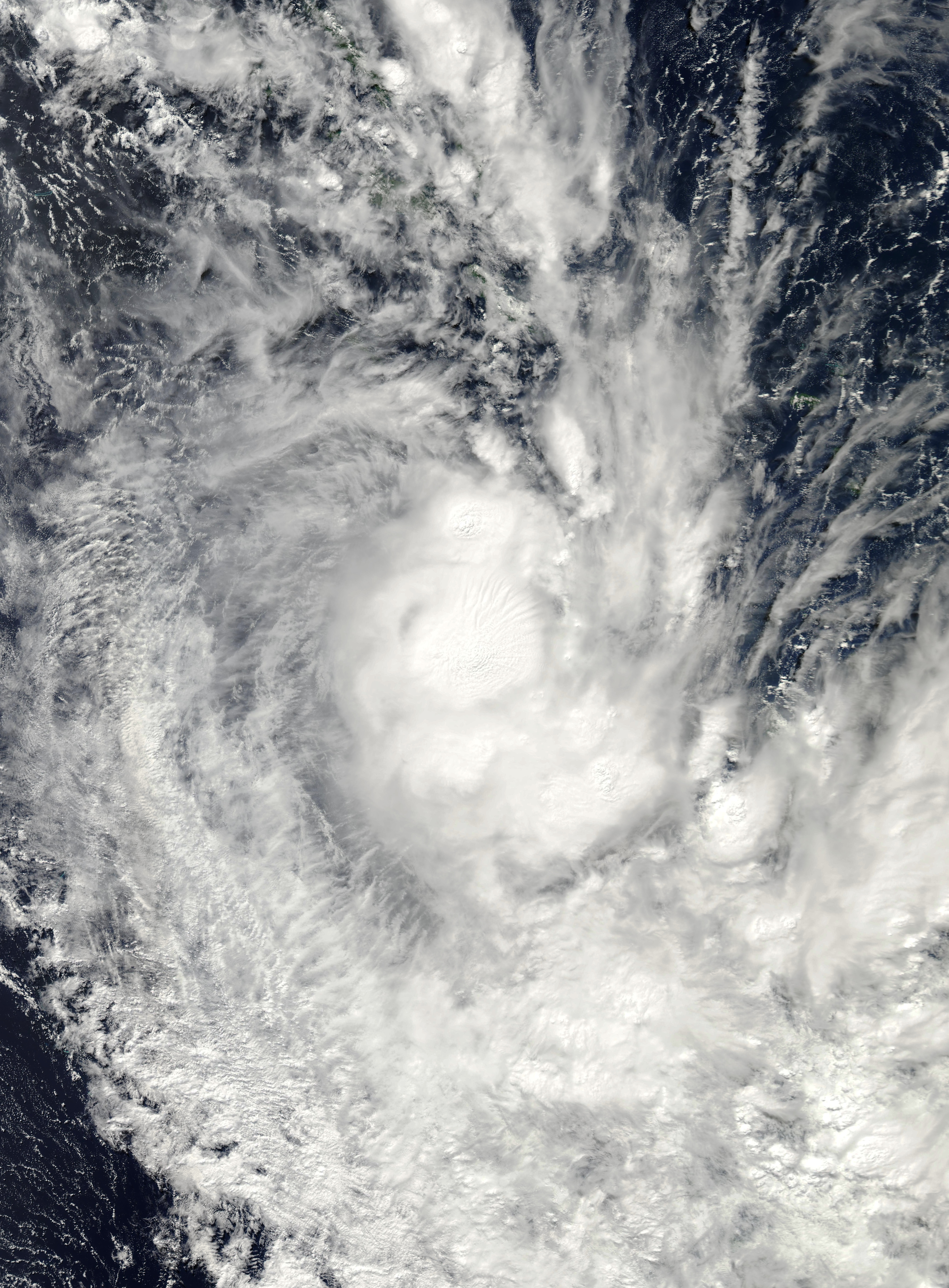
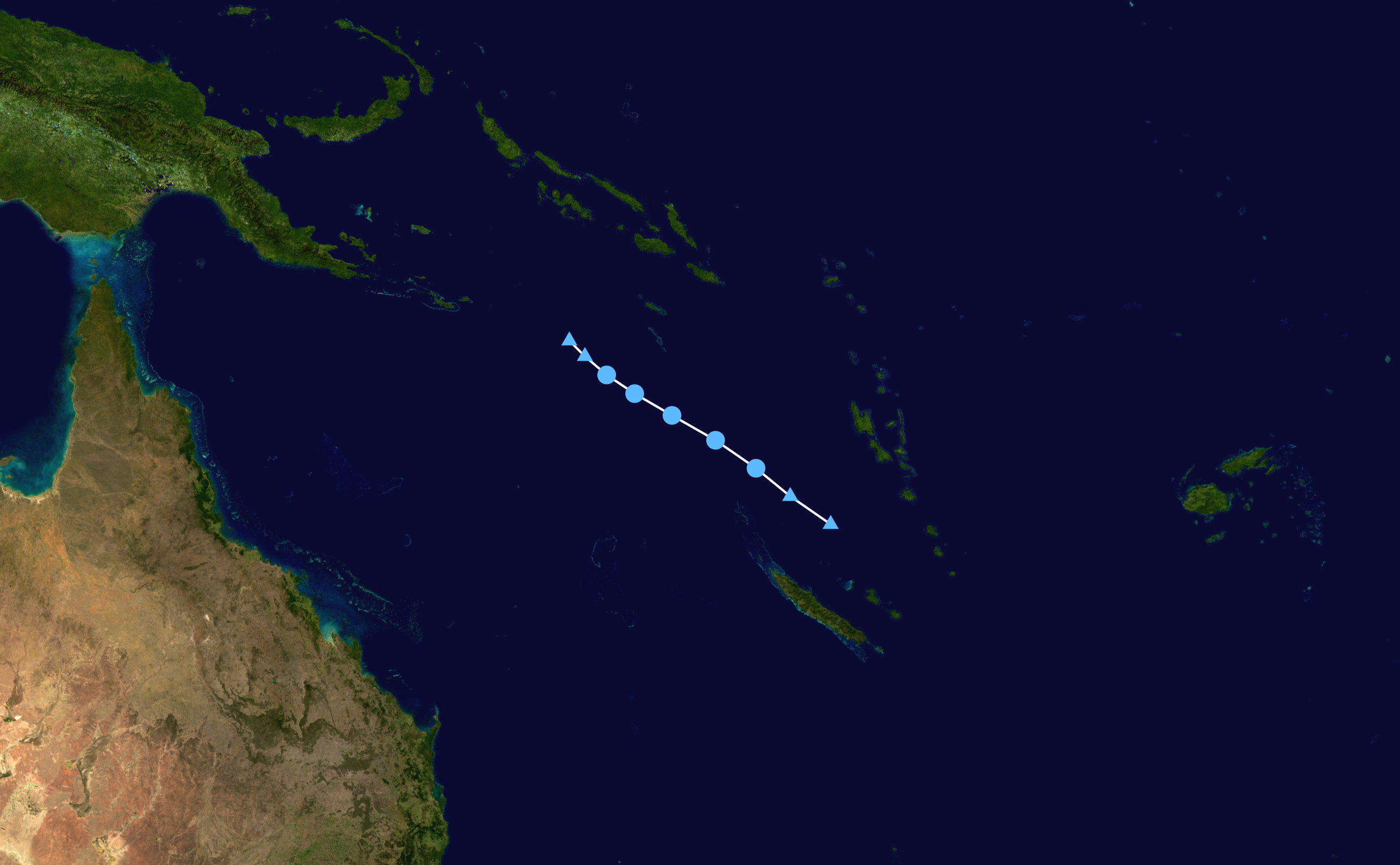
- Duration: April 16 – April 19
- Peak intensity: 55 km/h (35 mph) (10-min); 998 hPa (mbar)

On April 16, a tropical disturbance developed about 1365 km (835 mi) northwest of New Caledonia, consisting of an elongated circulation within a marginal upper-level environment. Despite anticipation that tropical cyclogenesis was unlikely in the short term, deep convection rapidly developed over an increasingly better defined circulation, with an anticyclone aloft aiding in intensification. Late on April 17, the Fiji Meteorological Service classified the system as Tropical Depression 16F, and early the next day the Joint Typhoon Warning Center classified it as Tropical Cyclone 27P. Initially, it was forecast to intensify further; however, the storm quickly became disorganized as wind shear increased. At 0000 UTC on April 19, the JTWC issued its final warning on the system as it began dissipating. with RSMC Nadi issuing its final tropical disturbance summary on the depression later that day.

=== Other systems ===
The first tropical depression of the season developed on October 17, about 670 km (415 mi) to the southeast of Honiara on the Solomon Island of Guadalcanal.

During January 12, the FMS reported that Tropical Depression 09F had developed over southern Tonga to the northwest of the island of Tongatapu. The system was located within an area of high vertical wind shear, while atmospheric convection associated with the system was active within the eastern and southern quadrants. Over the next day, the system moved south-southeastwards and its low-level cyclonic curvature became difficult to see in satellite imagery, before it was last noted later that day.

On February 17, RSMC Nadi reported that Tropical Depression 13F had developed about 240 km (150 mi), to the southeast of Avarua on the Southern Cook Island of Rarotonga. During the next day, the depression moved towards the south and was last noted by RSMC Nadi during the next day, as it moved into TCWC Wellington's area of responsibility.

== Season effects ==
| Name | Dates | Peak intensity | | | Areas affected | Damage (USD) | Deaths | Ref(s). |
| Name | Dates | Category | Wind speed | Pressure | Areas affected | Damage (USD) | Deaths | Ref(s). |
|---|---|---|---|---|---|---|---|---|
| 01F | October 17–19 | Tropical Depression | Not specified | 1,000 hPa (29.53 inHg) | Solomon Islands | None | None | |
| 02F | November 20–22 | Tropical Depression | Not specified | 1,001 hPa (29.56 inHg) | Fiji | None | None | |
| 03F | November 22 – December 2 | Tropical Depression | Not specified | 999 hPa (29.5 inHg) | | | | |
| Daman | December 3–10 | Category 4 Severe Tropical Cyclone | 185 km/h (115 mph) | 925 hPa (27.32 inHg) | Fiji, Tonga | $330,000 | None | |
| 05F | December 11–14 | Tropical Depression | 45 km/h (30 mph) | 1,000 hPa (29.53 inHg) | | | | |
| 06F | December 26–28 | Tropical Disturbance | 35 km/h (20 mph) | 1,006 hPa (29.71 inHg) | | | | |
| Elisa | January 7–11 | Category 2 Tropical Cyclone | 95 km/h (60 mph) | 980 hPa (28.94 inHg) | | | | |
| 08F | January 9–14 | Tropical Depression | 45 km/h (30 mph) | 998 hPa (29.47 inHg) | | | | |
| 09F | January 12–13 | Tropical Depression | Not specified | 999 hPa (29.5 inHg) | Tonga | None | None | |
| Funa | January 14–21 | Category 4 Severe Tropical Cyclone | 175 km/h (110 mph) | 930 hPa (27.46 inHg) | Vanuatu, New Zealand | | None | |
| 11F | January 19–24 | Tropical Depression | 75 km/h (45 mph) | 999 hPa (29.5 inHg) | | | | |
| Gene | January 26 – February 6 | Category 3 Severe Tropical Cyclone | 155 km/h (95 mph) | 955 hPa (28.20 inHg) | Fiji, New Caledonia, Vanuatu | $35 million | 8 | |
| 13F | February 17–18 | Tropical Depression | 45 km/h (30 mph) | 1,008 hPa (29.77 inHg) | None | | | |
| 14F/24P | March 19–23 | Tropical Depression | 55 km/h (35 mph) | 998 hPa (29.47 inHg) | None | None | None | |
| 15F | April 4–7 | Tropical Depression | 45 km/h (30 mph) | 1,002 hPa (29.59 inHg) | None | None | | |
| 16F | April 16–19 | Tropical Depression | 55 km/h (35 mph) | 998 hPa (29.47 inHg) | New Caledonia | None | None | |
Season aggregates
| 16 systems | October 16 – April 19 | | 165 km/h (105 mph) | 935 hPa (27.61 inHg) | | > | | |

== See also ==
- Tropical cyclones in 2007 and 2008
- Atlantic hurricane seasons: 2007, 2008
- Pacific hurricane seasons: 2007, 2008
- Pacific typhoon seasons: 2007, 2008
- North Indian Ocean cyclone seasons: 2007, 2008
