= Cyclone Gene =

Category 3 South Pacific cyclone in 2008

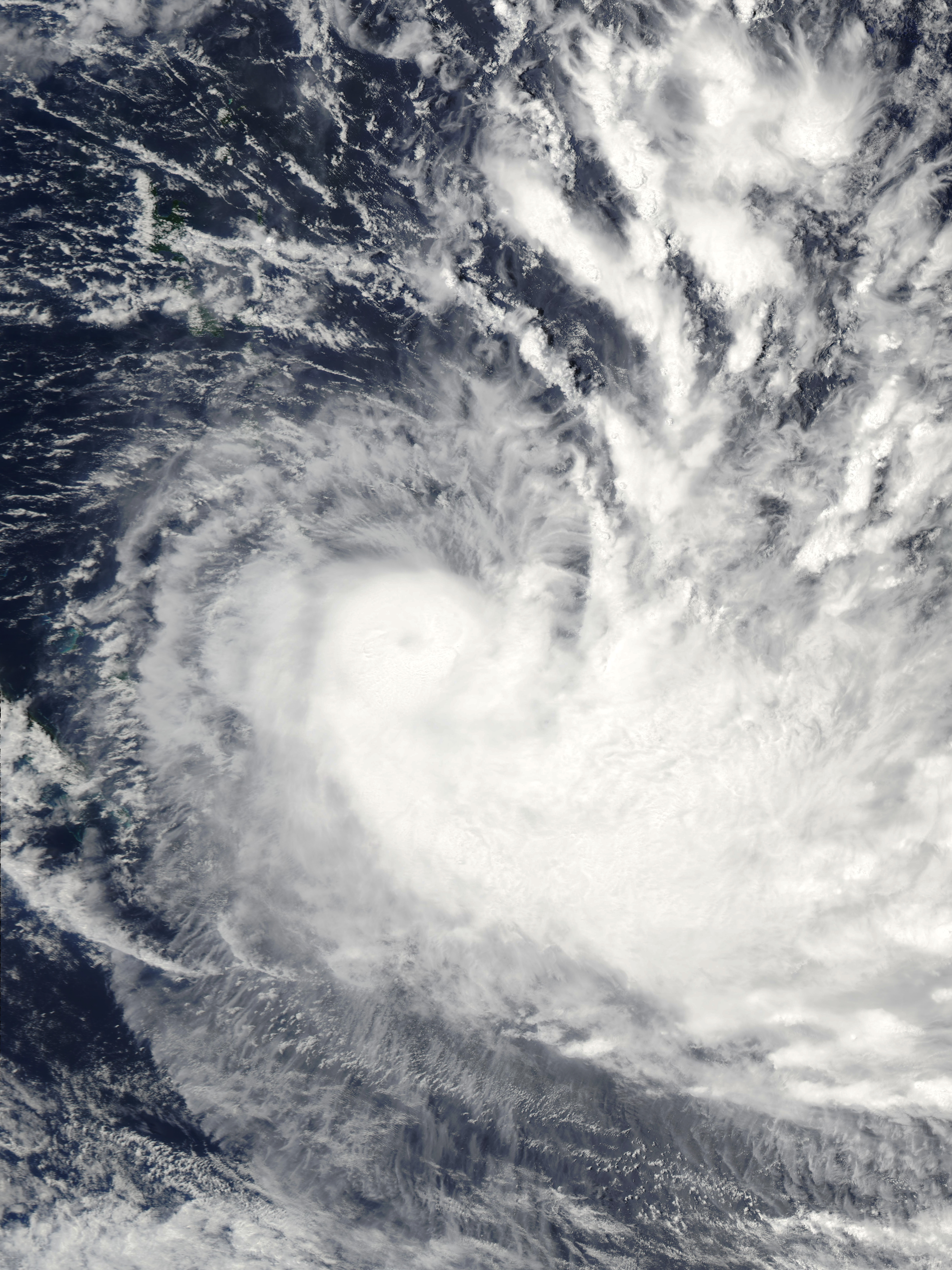
- Tropical Cyclone Gene at its peak intensity

Meteorological history
- Formed: January 26, 2008
- Extratropical: February 6, 2008
- Dissipated: February 9, 2008

Category 3 severe tropical cyclone
- 10-minute sustained (FMS)
- Highest winds: 155 km/h (100 mph)
- Lowest pressure: 945 hPa (mbar); 27.91 inHg

Category 3-equivalent tropical cyclone
- 1-minute sustained (SSHWS/JTWC)
- Highest winds: 185 km/h (115 mph)

Overall effects
- Fatalities: 5 direct, 3 indirect
- Damage: $35 million (2007 USD)
- Areas affected: Fiji, Vanuatu
- IBTrACS
- Part of the 2007–08 South Pacific cyclone season

Severe Tropical Cyclone Gene was the deadliest storm as well as the most damaging tropical cyclone of the 2007–08 South Pacific cyclone season east of 160ºE. RSMC Nadi monitored Gene as the 12th tropical disturbance, as well as the fourth tropical cyclone and the third severe tropical cyclone to form west of 160ºE during the 2007–08 South Pacific cyclone season. Gene was also recognised by RSMC Nadi as the fifth tropical cyclone and fourth severe tropical cyclone to form within the South Pacific Ocean during the 2007-08 season.

On January 25, a tropical disturbance formed within the Fijian Archipelago and was designated as Tropical Disturbance 12F. The next day it was upgraded to a tropical depression, whilst on January 27, RSMC Nadi named the depression as Cyclone Gene. Later that day Gene made landfall on Fiji, and caused 8 deaths and $51 million (2008, F$). Cyclone Gene then slowly intensified to a category three cyclone on both the Saffir–Simpson hurricane scale and the Australian Cyclone Intensity Scale. Gene then took a turn to the south moving towards 25°S which marks the edge of RSMC Nadi's area of responsibility with the Tropical Cyclone Warning Centre (TCWC) in Wellington, New Zealand. Gene then crossed 25°S on February 3 and Nadi released their final advisory. Cyclone Gene continued as a Tropical Cyclone for three days before becoming an extratropical cyclone. Early on February 6 TCWC Wellington released their final advisory on tropical cyclone Gene as they declared it as extratropical.

Cyclone Gene caused widespread damage to several of Fiji's main islands, including Viti Levu, Vanua Levu, Taveuni, Yasawa, Mamanuca, and other outlying island groups, while killing a total of 8 people. The cyclone also caused severe damage to Vanuatu's Futuna island after its outer bands lashed the island with gale force windspeeds and heavy rain for 12 hours.

== Meteorological history ==
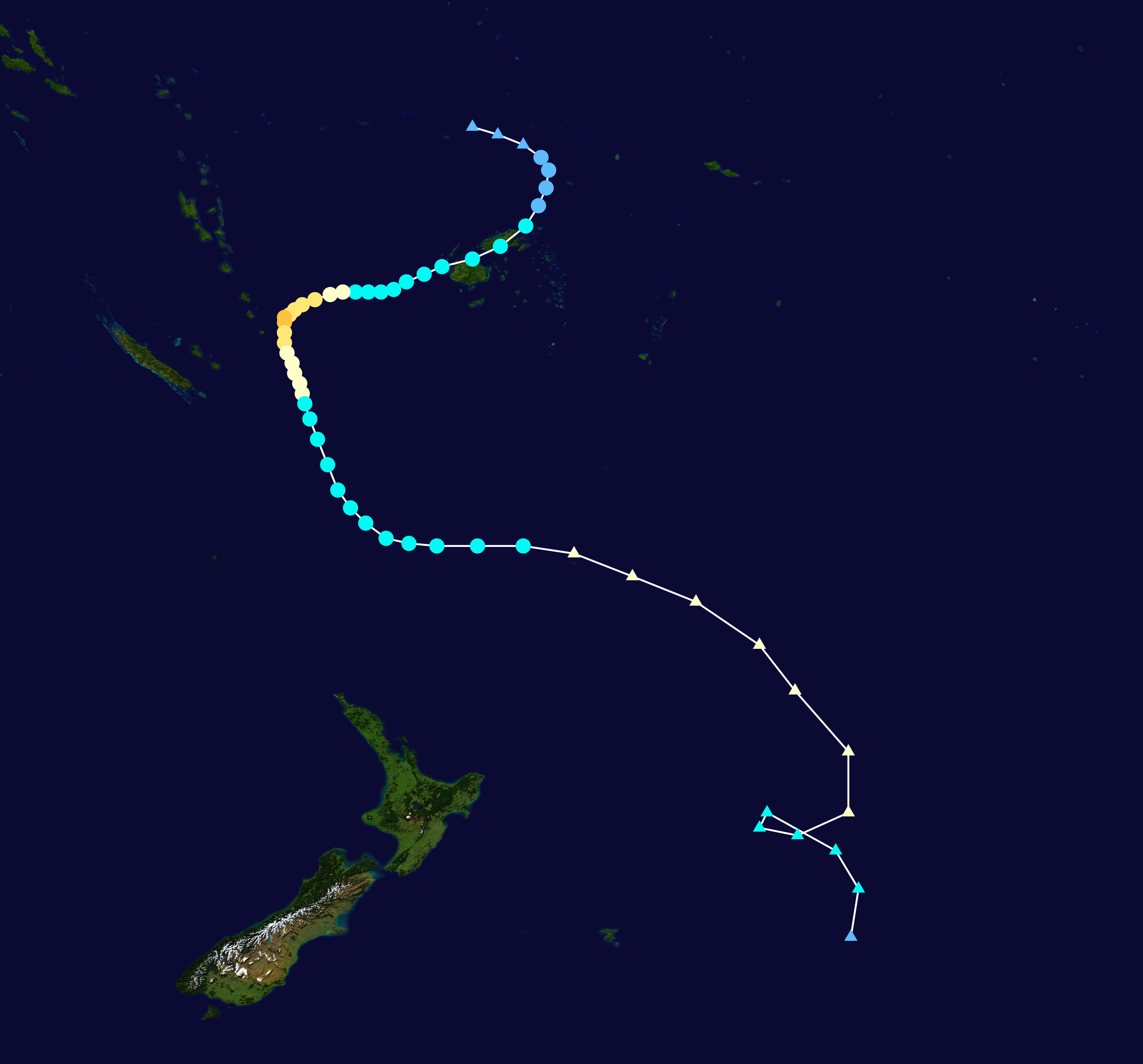
Map plotting the storm's track and intensity, according to the Saffir–Simpson scale Map key Saffir–Simpson scale Tropical depression (≤38 mph, ≤62 km/h) Tropical storm (39–73 mph, 63–118 km/h) Category 1 (74–95 mph, 119–153 km/h) Category 2 (96–110 mph, 154–177 km/h) Category 3 (111–129 mph, 178–208 km/h) Category 4 (130–156 mph, 209–251 km/h) Category 5 (≥157 mph, ≥252 km/h) Unknown Storm type Tropical cyclone Subtropical cyclone Extratropical cyclone, remnant low, tropical disturbance, or monsoon depression

During January 26, the Fiji Meteorological Service and the United States Joint Typhoon Warning Center started to monitor a weak tropical disturbance that had developed within the monsoon trough about 290 km (180 mi) to the northeast of the Fijian dependency of Rotuma. The disturbance initially moved towards the southeast before it recurved and started to move towards the southwest and Fiji during the next day, while gradually developing further in an area of low vertical windshear. At 1800 UTC on January 27, the JTWC reported that the disturbance had developed into Tropical Cyclone 15P and started to issue warnings on it as the 1-minute windspeeds had become equivalent to a tropical storm. Over the next 6–12 hours, the disturbance moved towards the southwest and hugged Vanua Levu's southeastern coast, under the influence of a mid level ridge of high pressure that was located to the southeast of the system. 15P's development was hindered while it was located over land, however it did not weaken significantly because it was located in an area of favourable upper level conditions.

While over land the system moved towards the south-southwest and moved into the Bligh Waters, where it started to rapidly intensify as convection erupted around the system. As a result, before the system made landfall on Viti Levu, RSMC Nadi reported that the system had intensified into a category 1 tropical cyclone, on the Australian cyclone intensity scale and named it Gene. The system then made landfall shortly after 0600 UTC near Lautoka, before it started to move westwards and passed near Nadi before it moved out of the archipelago. Early on January 29 as the system moved westwards, RSMC Nadi reported that Gene had intensified into a category two tropical cyclone before it briefly weakened into a Category 1 because of the effects of a moderate amount of vertical windshear. However, the system quickly reintensified and by 1200 UTC the next day had become a category 3 Severe Tropical Cyclone and equivalent to a Category 1 tropical cyclone on the Saffir–Simpson hurricane scale.

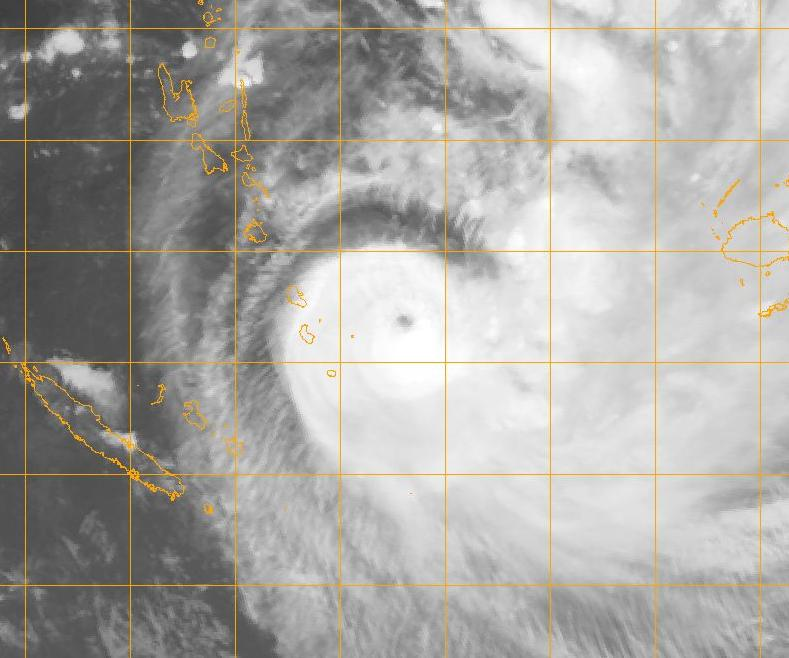
Tropical Cyclone Gene near Vanuatu on January 31

On January 31, while the storm was moving closer to Vanuatu, Gene attained peak winds of 150 km/h (95 mph10 min) & 185 km/h (115 mph 1-min) Thus, Cyclone Gene was a Category 3 cyclone on the Australian scale and the Saffir–Simpson hurricane scale.

During February 1, as Cyclone Gene was moving to the west, Gene recurved and started moving towards the south and missed Vanuatu. The next day cyclone Gene started to temporarily weaken again by becoming a category two cyclone with winds speeds of 95 km/h (60 mph 10 min). This came as cyclone Gene approached 25°S which marks the edge of RSMC Nadi's area of responsibility, to the south of 25°S the Tropical Cyclone Warning Centre (TCWC) in Wellington, New Zealand, monitors tropical cyclones, south of 25°S. As Gene crossed in to TCWC Wellington's area of responsibility, Cyclone Gene started to re-intensify becoming a severe tropical cyclone again with peak winds of 120 km/h (105 mph 10 min) however this re-intensification only lasted for 12 hours before Gene began to weaken for the final time by becoming a tropical cyclone that day. Gene slowly weakened over the next couple of days as it moved towards the south east. The JTWC then issued its final warning on February 6 as Cyclone Gene was finishing its extratropical transition, and had also become fully embedded within the baroclinic zone. TCWC Wellington continued to monitor the extratropical remnants of Gene until February 9, after the sustained windspeeds had dropped to below 65 km/h (40 mph).

== Effects ==
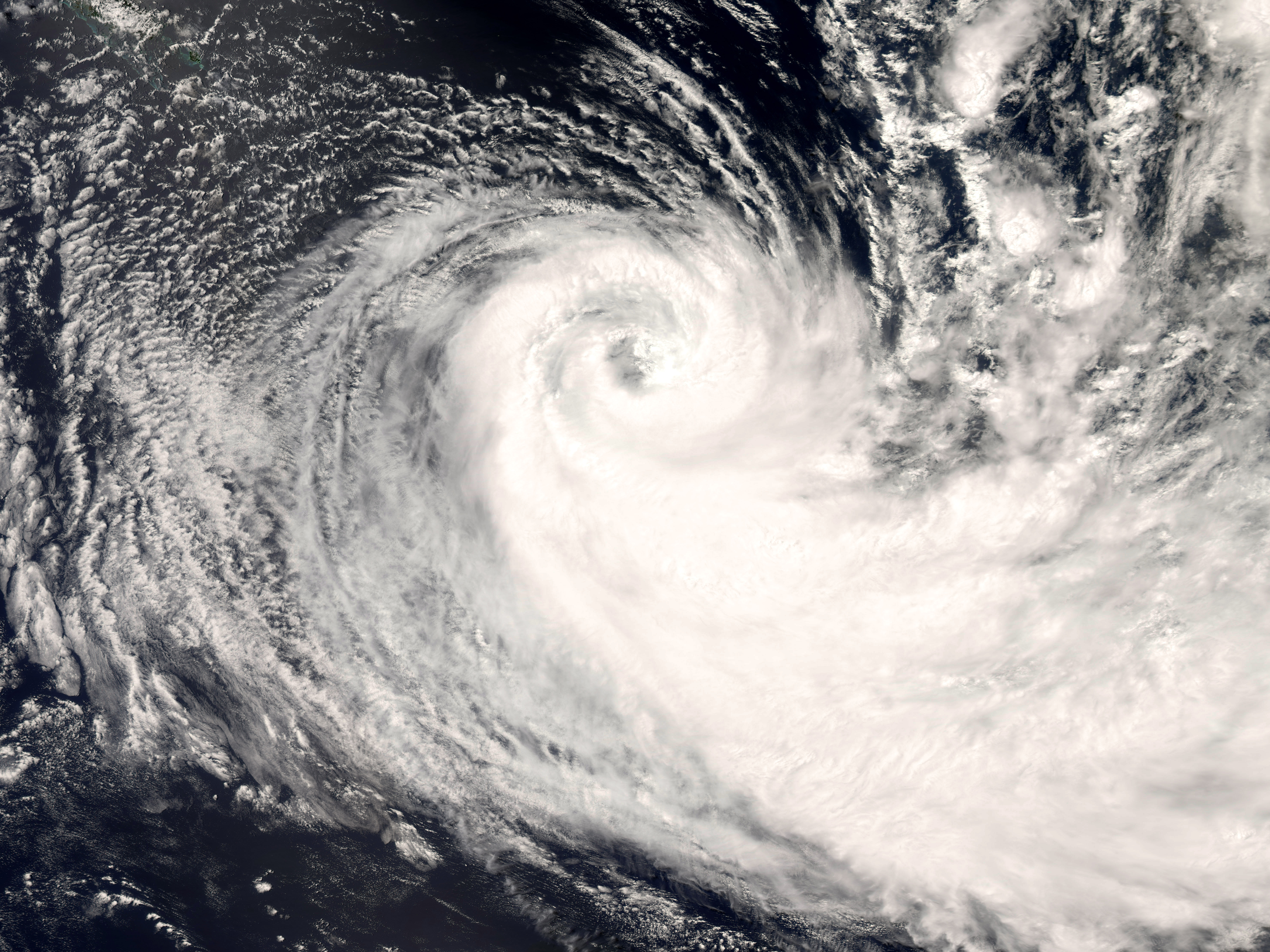
Tropical Cyclone Gene on February 4

=== Fiji ===
On January 27, RSMC Nadi issued strong wind warnings for Fiji, as 12F was expected to affect Fiji but not develop into a tropical cyclone until it had moved out of the archipelago. However, as 12F rapidly developed into a tropical cyclone during that day, RSMC Nadi was forced to issue gale force wind warnings for various parts of Fiji including Vanua Levu, Viti Levu, Beqa, Vatulele, Lomaiviti, Yasawa and Mamanuca.

When Cyclone Gene hit Fiji, it caused widespread minor damage on both of the main islands of Fiji including Vanua Levu and Viti Levu as well as a few of the other minor islands in Fiji which included Taveuni & the Yasawa group of islands. Power cuts were reported in at least half of Fiji including Suva and Nadi however power was quickly restored to these areas. Within Fiji over 340 people evacuated to 61 evacuation centres which were opened by the Fijian government. There was also 61 houses completely flattened by cyclone Gene.

The effects of Cyclone Gene were compounded by continuous heavy rainfall and subsequent floods in most parts of Viti Levu. As a result, there was significant disruption to water supplies, with several sources becoming contaminated and destroyed as a result there were several cases of Typhoid reported in Fiji with at least 1 person dying from typhoid. There was also seven other deaths from cyclone Gene, five of these were directly related whilst two people were also killed as an indirect result of Cyclone Gene from house fires while using candles to light their homes when the power went out. Within their end of season report RSMC Nadi reported that the total cost of Cyclone Gene was F$51 million (2008), ($35 million 2008 USD).

=== Vanuatu ===
After exiting the Fijian archipelago of islands, Cyclone Gene moved towards the west across the South Pacific, towards Vanuatu, and was predicted to affect the archipelago between January 31 and February 2. However, during January 31, the system started to re-curve towards the southeast and as a result did not make landfall on the island, but Gene's outer bands produced gale force winds and heavy rain on various southern Vanuatuan islands for about 12 hours. However the system only caused no deaths and severe damage to Futuna island, while sparing other nearby islands. On Futuna Island, Gene caused damages to buildings, Plants used for weaving and generating income, trails, native and non native homes, waterlines, food gardens, food producing plants, crops, and other critical structures and littered footpaths with fallen trees and debris. As a result of damages to waterlines from falling debris, flooding and contaminated drinking water were reported in some villages with pipes openly leaking. After an aerial survey found that more than 70% of garden crops had been damaged by Gene, the Vanuatu Government declared Futuna island a disaster zone.

== See also ==
- Cyclone Guba
- 2007–08 South Pacific cyclone season
- Timeline of the 2007–08 South Pacific cyclone season
