= Cyclone Funa =

Tropical cyclone in the South Pacific

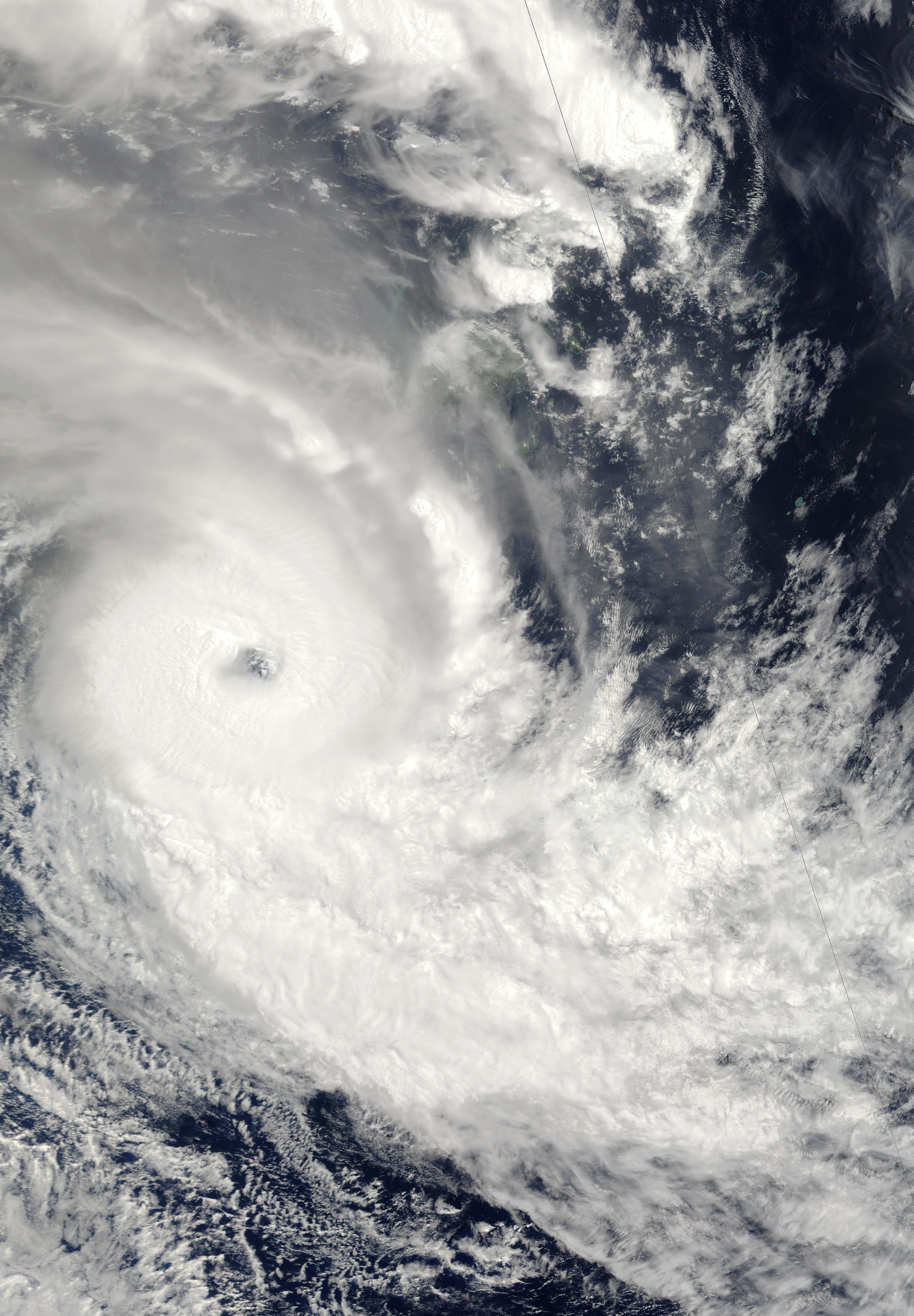
- Cyclone Funa at peak intensity

Meteorological history
- Formed: 15 January 2008
- Extratropical: 20 January 2008
- Dissipated: 22 January 2008

Category 4 severe tropical cyclone
- 10-minute sustained (FMS)
- Highest winds: 175 km/h (110 mph)
- Lowest pressure: 930 hPa (mbar); 27.46 inHg

Category 3-equivalent tropical cyclone
- 1-minute sustained (SSHWS/JTWC)
- Highest winds: 195 km/h (120 mph)
- Lowest pressure: 944 hPa (mbar); 27.88 inHg

Overall effects
- Fatalities: None
- Areas affected: Vanuatu, New Zealand
- IBTrACS
- Part of the 2007–08 South Pacific cyclone season

Severe Tropical Cyclone Funa was the second strongest tropical cyclone during the 2007–08 South Pacific cyclone season, causing heavy flood and wind damage to areas of Vanuatu. The third tropical cyclone and second severe tropical cyclone of the season to form to the west of 160°E, Funa formed from an area of disturbed weather within the monsoon trough northeast of Vanuatu on 16 January 2008. Steadily intensifying as it moved to the east and subsequently south, Funa reached peak intensity with 10-minute sustained winds of 175 km/h (110 mph). However, the cyclone encountered unfavorable conditions as it progressed further south, before transitioning into an extratropical cyclone on 21 January.

Cyclone Funa severely affected areas of Vanuatu, especially to the island chain's infrastructure. Regions of the coast were also inundated by sea flooding caused by strong storm surge associated with Funa. Offshore, the cruise ship Pacific Star sustained heavy damage from the cyclone's strong waves. The cyclone's remnants later caused strong winds in New Zealand, resulting in power outages and fires.

== Meteorological history ==
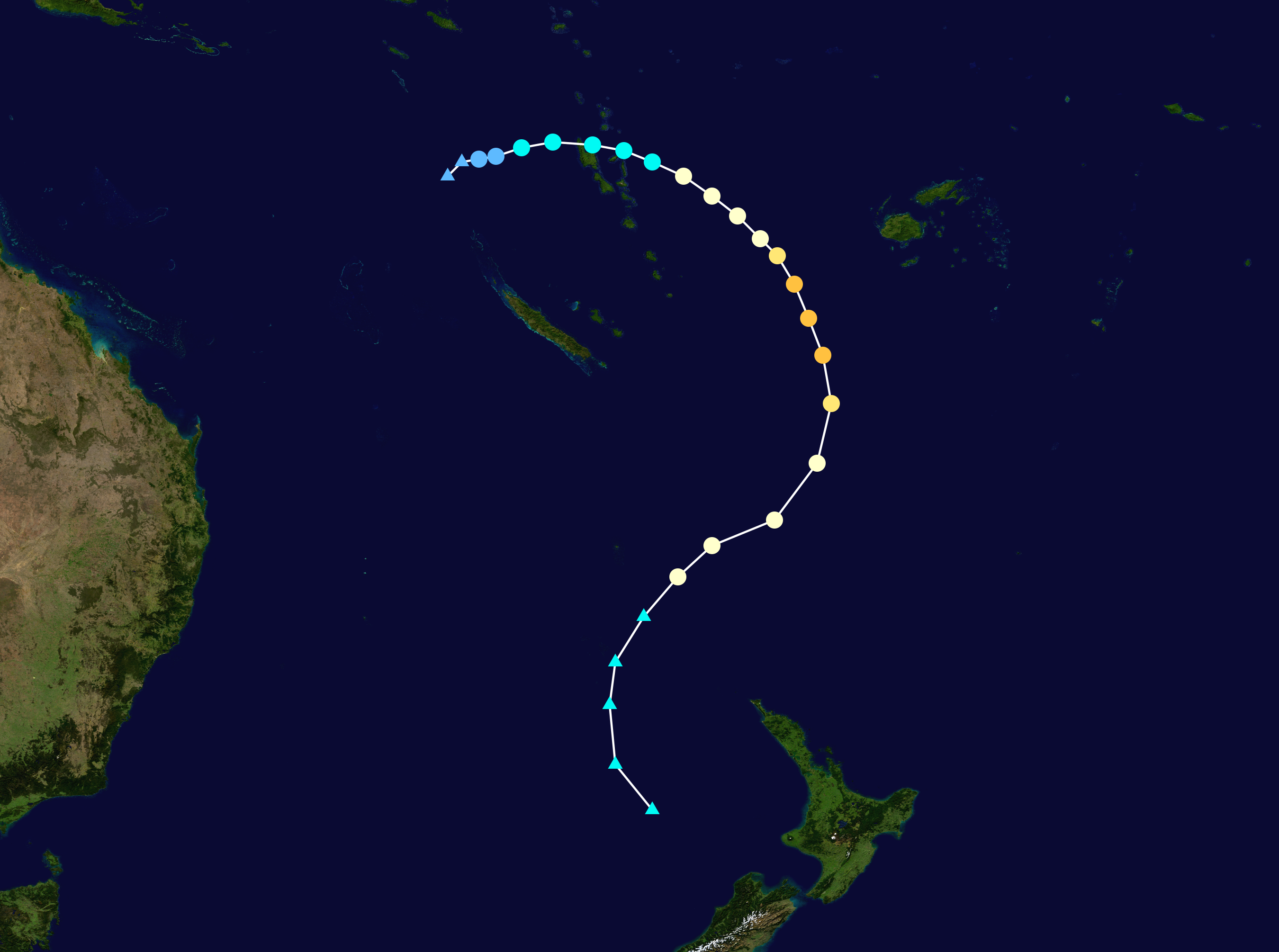
Map plotting the storm's track and intensity, according to the Saffir–Simpson scale Map key Saffir–Simpson scale Tropical depression (≤38 mph, ≤62 km/h) Tropical storm (39–73 mph, 63–118 km/h) Category 1 (74–95 mph, 119–153 km/h) Category 2 (96–110 mph, 154–177 km/h) Category 3 (111–129 mph, 178–208 km/h) Category 4 (130–156 mph, 209–251 km/h) Category 5 (≥157 mph, ≥252 km/h) Unknown Storm type Tropical cyclone Subtropical cyclone Extratropical cyclone, remnant low, tropical disturbance, or monsoon depression

On 14 January, the Fiji Meteorological Service (FMS) reported that Tropical Disturbance 10F had developed within a monsoonal trough of low pressure about 700 km (435 mi) to the northwest of Port Vila in Vanuatu.

By 06:00 UTC on 15 January, the Fiji Meteorological Service (FMS) reported that Tropical Disturbance 10F had developed within a monsoon trough extending from northern Australia to the north of Fiji. At this stage, atmospheric convection flared around the system's broad and developing low level circulation centre, while the system was located within an area of moderate vertical wind shear. Over the next day, vertical wind shear surrounding the system relaxed, while atmospheric convection wrapped into the disturbances rapidly consolidating low level circulation centre. As a result, the JTWC initiated advisories on the system and designated it as Tropical Cyclone 12P, while the FMS reported that the system had intensified into a category 1 tropical cyclone on the Australian tropical cyclone intensity scale and named it Funa.

The cyclone then started to move eastwards, and early on 17 January it passed near the northern tip of Aurora Island, Vanuatu with wind speeds of 55 knots (102 km/h), making Funa a category two cyclone on the Australian scale. After leaving Vanuatu, Funa intensified slowly becoming a Category 3 severe tropical cyclone on 18 January and then early the next day it reached its peak wind speeds of 95 knots (176 km/h) which is the same as a Category 4 cyclone according to the Southern Pacific Cyclone Scale. The JTWC measured Funa's peak winds at 105 knots (194 km/h). The storm then moved into TCWC Wellington area of responsibility it started to weaken and then became extratropical the next day with the JTWC issuing their final advisory on 20 January, with TCWC Wellington downgrading it to a low later that day.

== Preparations and impact ==
Severe damage occurred over the groups of islands in the Torba, Sanma, and Penama provinces of Vanuatu, particularly on dwellings (made of local material), trees, and crops. Over the Banks Islands, coastal villages were reported to have been inundated by sea flooding, including in Maewo. On Mota Lava and Rah Island, as well as Gaua, bungalows, resorts, and restaurants along the coast were either washed away or inundated by sea flooding, according to their provincial council reports. Most schools in the Torba and Penama provinces sustained major damages to classrooms and other semi-permanent structures, while other buildings had their roofs ripped off. There were no reports of any fatalities but minor casualties were confirmed.

On 19 January, a cruise ship, the Pacific Star, encountered 7 metre (22.9 ft) waves produced by Funa. Numerous windows were broken on the ship as it was tossed around by the waves. Water poured into passengers rooms through broken windows, causing panic throughout the ship. Five people were injured, one of whom sustained a broken rib after falling out of bed when a wave hit the ship. The bar area of the ship was reportedly significantly damaged and dishes and glasses were shattered in the kitchen.

The remnants of Funa produced high winds in the North Island of New Zealand which knocked down numerous trees, cutting power to 16,000 residents on the island. Downed power lines sparked several fires. Waves up to 5 m (16.4 ft) impacted coastal regions of New Zealand, forcing boaters to remain in port. Upwards of 300 mm (11.8 in) of rain fell across parts of New Zealand and gale-force winds fanned brushfires.

The World Meteorological Organization's RA V Tropical Cyclone Committee later retired the name Funa from the South Pacific naming lists and replaced it with Fotu.

== See also ==
- List of South Pacific cyclone seasons
- 2007–08 South Pacific cyclone season
- Cyclone Guba
- Timeline of the 2007–08 South Pacific cyclone season
