= Bligh Water =

Coordinates: 17°0′38.67″S 177°51′11.45″E

In 1789 the English Royal Navy Cutter Bounty commanded by Lieutenant William Bligh was overtaken by 18 crew led by Master's Mate Fletcher Christian in what has been named the "Mutiny on the Bounty." The area known as the Bligh Water is the body of water (approximately 9500 km^{2} in extent) in the western Fiji islands through which Bligh sailed his 7 m (23 ft) launch during his 3,618-mile (5823 km) journey from Tofua to the Dutch port of Timor. At the time some of the local Fijian tribes were considered hostile and many were cannibalistic; so Bligh did not wish to jeopardize his or his crew's safety and elected not to stop his journey in the area.

== Scuba diving the Bligh Water ==
Today many people refer to the area of the Vatu-I-Ra Passage, around the island of Vatu, as the "Bligh Water". While this is technically true, and the Vatu-I-Ra passage is located in the Bligh Water; the real Bligh Water is much larger. The Vatu-I-Ra Passage, now a marine protected area, is famous for its abundance and diversity of marine life. One of the main attractions is the plentiful populations of beautiful hard and soft corals which thousands of scuba divers each year visit to enjoy and photograph.
