= Timeline of the 2008–09 South Pacific cyclone season =

Timeline of the 2008-09 South Pacific cyclone season
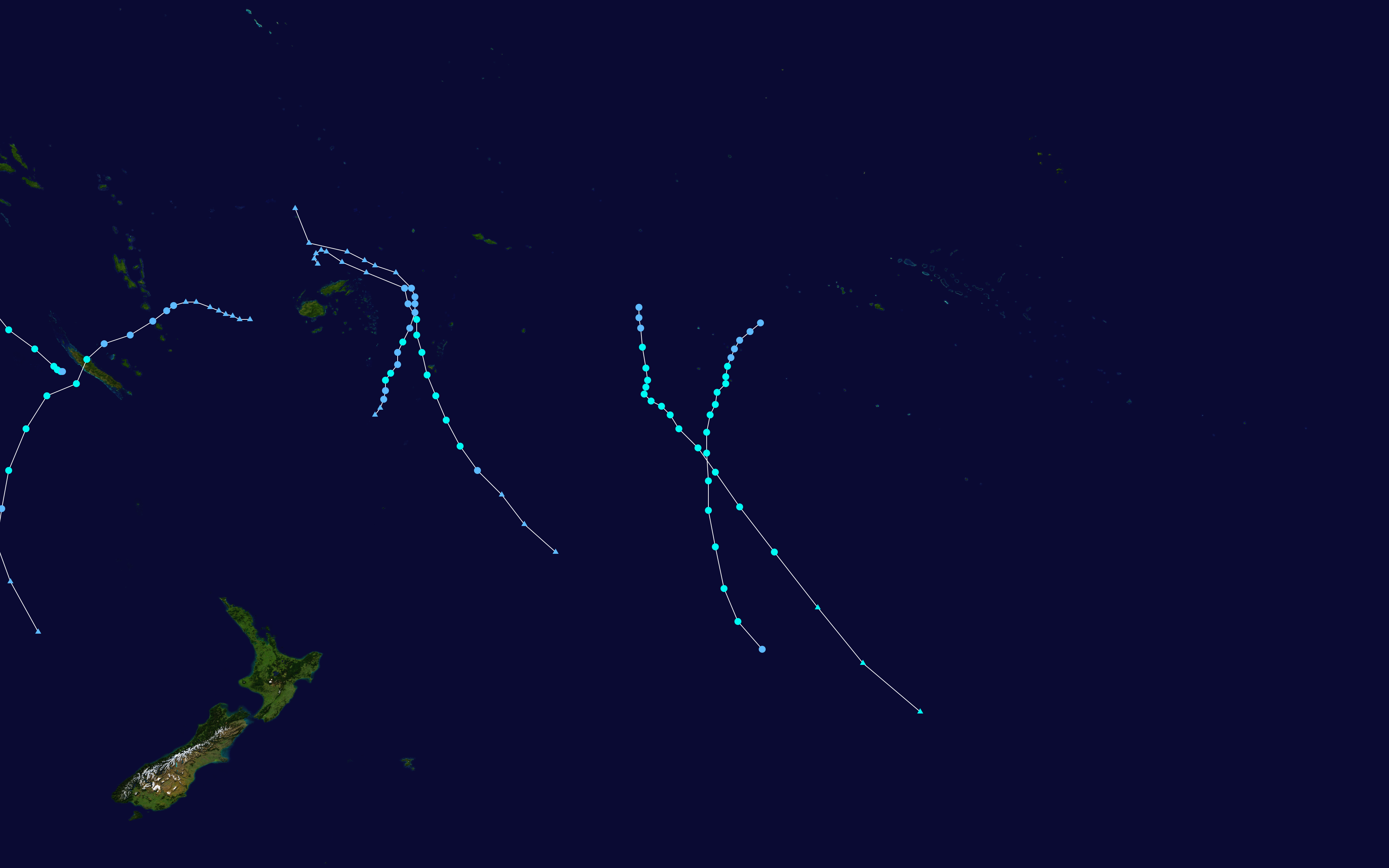
- Season summary map

Season boundaries
- First system formed: December 1, 2008

Longest lasting system
- Name: 04F
- Duration: 10 days
Storm articles
- January 2009 Fiji floods (04F)

The 2008–09 South Pacific cyclone season was a below-average season with only six tropical cyclones occurring within the South Pacific between 160°E and 120°W. The season officially ran from November 1, 2008 to April 30, 2009 with the first disturbance of the season forming on December 1 and the last disturbance moving out of the region on April 11. (Note: An average season has nine tropical cyclones, about half of which become severe tropical cyclones.) (Note: RSMC Nadi warns on systems in the South Pacific which is located from the equator to 25°S and from 160°E to 120°W. TCWC Wellington warns on systems from 25°S to 40°S and from 160°E to 120°W)

For the fourth season in a row tropical cyclone activity in the South Pacific was below its climatological average of nine tropical cyclones, with only six tropical cyclones occurring within the region. The most damaging tropical disturbance was Tropical Depression 04F which also was the deadliest tropical disturbance occurring during the season. The depression caused $45 million (2009 USD; $66 million 2025 USD) in damage and killed twelve people when it caused the worst economic natural disaster in Viti Levu since the drought of 1998.

During the season tropical cyclones were monitored by the Regional Specialized Meteorological Center (RSMC) in Nadi, Fiji, and the Tropical Cyclone Warning Center (TCWC) in Wellington, New Zealand. RSMC Nadi attached a number and an F suffix to tropical disturbances that formed in or moved into the South Pacific. The United States Joint Typhoon Warning Center (JTWC) also issued unofficial warnings throughout during the season, designating tropical cyclones with a number and a P suffix. RSMC Nadi and TCWC Wellington both use the Australian Tropical Cyclone Intensity Scale, and measured windspeeds over a period of ten minutes, while the JTWC measured sustained winds over a period of one minute and uses the Saffir–Simpson hurricane scale.

This timeline includes information from post-storm reviews by RSMC Nadi, TCWC Wellington and the JTWC. It documents tropical cyclone formations, strengthening, weakening, landfalls, extratropical transitions, and dissipations during the season. Reports among warning centers often differ; as such, information from all three agencies has been included.

== Timeline of storms ==
=== November ===
November 1

- 0000 UTC, (1200 FST) – The 2008–09 South Pacific cyclone season officially begins. (Note: UTC stands for Coordinated Universal Time.) (Note: FST stands for Fiji Standard Time, which is equivalent to UTC+12.)
- There were no tropical disturbances reported in the South Pacific during November 2008.

=== December ===
December 1

- 0600 UTC, (1800 FST) – RSMC Nadi reports that Tropical Disturbance 01F has formed about 665 km (415 mi) to the northwest of Pago Pago, in American Samoa. (Note: The figures for maximum sustained winds and position estimates are rounded to the nearest 5 units (knots, miles, or kilometers), following the convention used in the Fiji Meteorological Service's operational products for each storm. All other units are rounded to the nearest digit.)

December 2

- 2100 UTC, (0900 FST, December 3) – RSMC Nadi issues the final advisory on Tropical Disturbance 01F.

December 3

- 0300 UTC, (1500 FST) – RSMC Nadi reports that Tropical Disturbance 02F has formed about 1200 km (745 mi) to the west of Papeete, French Polynesia.

December 4

- 1800 UTC, (0600 FST, December 5) – RSMC Nadi reports that Tropical Disturbance 02F has intensified into a tropical depression.

December 6

- 1800 UTC, (0600 FST, December 7) – RSMC Nadi issues the final advisory on Tropical Depression 02F.

December 10

- 1800 UTC, (0600 FST, December 11) – RSMC Nadi reports that Tropical Disturbance 03F has formed about 275 km (170 mi) to the northeast of Honiara, Solomon Islands.

December 11

- 0900 UTC, (2100 FST) – RSMC Nadi issues the final advisory on Tropical Disturbance 03F.

=== January ===
January 5

- 0000 UTC, (1200 FST) – RSMC Nadi reports that the Tropical Depression 04F has formed about 800 km (500 mi) to the northwest of Port Vila, Vanuatu.

January 8

- 2100 UTC, (0900 FST, January 8) – RSMC Nadi reports that Tropical Depression 04F has weakened into an extratropical depression.
- 2100 UTC, (0900 FST, January 8) – RSMC Nadi issues its final advisory on extratropical depression 04F.

January 9

- 1800 UTC, (0600 FST, January 9) – RSMC Nadi resumes advisories on extratropical depression 04F.
- 1800 UTC, (0600 FST, January 9) – RSMC Nadi transfers primary warning responsibility of extratropical depression 04F to TCWC Wellington.

January 10

- 0600 UTC, (1800 FST) – TCWC Wellington issues the final advisory on extratropical depression 04F.

January 11

- 2100 UTC, (0900 FST, January 11) – RSMC Nadi issues its first advisory on Tropical Low 07U, as it moves into the South Pacific from the Australian region.
- 0600 UTC, (1800 FST) – RSMC Nadi designates Tropical Low 07U as Tropical Depression 05F.

January 14

- 0600 UTC, (1800 FST) – RSMC Nadi issues the final advisory on Tropical Depression 05F (07U).

January 19

- 1800 UTC, (0600 UTC, January 20) – RSMC Nadi reports that Tropical Disturbance 06F has formed about 1000 km (620 mi) to the northeast of Papeete, French Polynesia.

January 20

- 1800 UTC, (0600 UTC, January 21) – RSMC Nadi reports that Tropical Disturbance 06F has intensified into a tropical depression.

January 24

- 0600 UTC, (1800 FST) – RSMC Nadi reports that Tropical Depression 07F has formed about 400 km (250 mi) to the northeast of Avarua on the island of Rarotonga within the southern Cook Islands.
- 1800 UTC, (0900 FST, January 25) – RSMC Nadi reports that Tropical Depression 07F has weakened into an extratropical depression.

January 25

- 0000 UTC, (1200 FST) – RSMC Nadi reports that Tropical Depression 08F has formed about 60 km (40 mi) to the north of the Fijian dependency of Rotuma.
- 0600 UTC, (1800 FST) – RSMC Nadi issues the final advisory on Tropical Depression 07F as it has lost all off its tropical characteristics.

January 26

- 1200 UTC, (0000 FST, January 27) – The JTWC designates Tropical Depression 08F as Tropical Depression 11P.

January 27

- 1800 UTC, (0600 FST, January 28) – The JTWC reports that Tropical Depression 08F (11P) has intensified into a tropical storm.
- 1800 UTC, (0600 FST, January 28) – The JTWC reports that Tropical Storm 08F (11P) has reached its peak 1-minute sustained wind speeds of 65 km/h (40 mph).

January 28

- 0000 UTC, (1200 FST) – The JTWC reports that Tropical Storm 08F (11P) has weakened into a tropical depression.
- 0900 UTC, (2100 FST) – RSMC Nadi reports that Tropical Depression 08F (11P) has intensified into a category 1 tropical cyclone, and names it Hettie.
- 0900 UTC, (2100 FST) – RSMC Nadi reports that Tropical Cyclone Hettie (11P) has reached its peak 10-minute sustained wind speeds of 65 km/h (40 mph).
- 1200 UTC, (0000 FST, January 29) – The JTWC reports that Tropical Depression Hettie (11P) has re-intensified into a tropical storm.
- 1200 UTC, (0600 FST, January 28) – The JTWC reports that Tropical Storm Hettie (11P) reattained its peak 1-minute sustained wind speeds of 65 km/h (40 mph).

January 29

- 0000 UTC, (1200 FST) – The JTWC reports that Tropical Storm Hettie (11P) has weakened into a tropical depression.
- 0600 UTC, (1800 FST) – RSMC Nadi reports that Tropical Cyclone Hettie (11P) has weakened into a tropical depression.
- 1800 UTC, (0600 FST, January 30) – RSMC Nadi issues its final advisory on Depression Hettie.

=== February ===
February 1

- 1800 UTC, (0600 FST, February 2) – RSMC Nadi reports that Tropical Depression 09F has formed about 575 km (360 mi) to the northwest of Port Vila, Vanuatu.

February 5

- 0000 UTC, (1200 FST) – RSMC Nadi reports that Tropical Depression 09F has weakened into an extratropical depression.
- 1200 UTC, (0000 FST, February 6) – RSMC Nadi transfers primary warning responsibility of extratropical depression 09F to TCWC Wellington.

February 6

- 0000 UTC, (1200 FST) – TCWC Wellington issues the final advisory on extratropical depression 09F.

February 13

- 1800 UTC, (0600 FST, February 14) – RSMC Nadi reports that Tropical Disturbance 10F has formed about 360 km (225 mi) to the east of Nadi, Fiji.

February 14

- 1800 UTC, (0600 FST, February 15) – RSMC Nadi reports that Tropical Disturbance 10F has intensified into a tropical depression.

February 15

- 1800 UTC, (0600 FST, February 16) – The JTWC designates Tropical Depression 10F as Tropical Depression 15P.

February 17

- 0000 UTC, (1200 FST) – The JTWC reports that Tropical Depression 10F (15P) has intensified into a tropical storm.
- 0600 UTC, (1800 FST) – Tropical Depression 10F (15P) makes landfall in New Caledonia.
- 0700 UTC, (1900 FST) – RSMC Nadi reports that Tropical Depression 10F has intensified into a category 1 tropical cyclone, and names it as Innis.
- 1200 UTC, (0000 FST, February 18) – RSMC Nadi reports that Tropical Cyclone Innis (15P) has reached its peak 1-minute sustained wind speeds of 75 km/h (45 mph).
- 1800 UTC, (0600 FST, February 18) – The JTWC reports that Tropical Cyclone Innis (15P) has reached its peak 1-minute sustained wind speeds of 75 km/h (45 mph).
- 1800 UTC, (0600 FST, February 18) – RSMC Nadi transfers primary warning responsibility for Tropical Cyclone Innis to TCWC Wellington.

February 18

- 0000 UTC, (1200 FST) – TCWC Wellington reports that Tropical Cyclone Innis (15P) has weakened into an extratropical depression.
- 0600 UTC, (1800 FST) – The JTWC reports that Tropical Cyclone Innis (15P) has weakened into a tropical depression.
- 1800 UTC, (0600 FST, February 18) – TCWC Wellington issues the final warning on extratropical depression Innis (15P).

=== March ===
March 10

- 0000 UTC, (1200 FST) – The JTWC reports that Tropical Depression 20P has formed about 270 km (170 mi) to the northwest of Rarotonga in the Cook Islands.
- 0600 UTC, (1800 FST, March 11) – RSMC Nadi designates Tropical Depression 20P as Tropical Depression 11F.

March 11

- 0600 UTC, (1800 FST) – The JTWC reports that Tropical Depression 11F (20P) has intensified into a tropical storm.
- 1200 UTC, (0000 FST, March 12) – RSMC Nadi reports that Tropical Depression 11F has intensified into a category 1 tropical cyclone, and names it Joni.
- 1800 UTC, (0600 FST, March 12) – The JTWC reports that Tropical Cyclone Joni has reached its peak 1-minute sustained wind speeds of 100 km/h (60 mph).

March 12

- 0600 UTC, (1800 FST) – RSMC Nadi reports that Tropical Cyclone Joni has intensified into a category 2 tropical cyclone.
- 1200 UTC, (0000 FST, March 13) – RSMC Nadi reports that Tropical Cyclone Joni has reached its peak 10-minute sustained wind speeds of 100 km/h (60 mph).
- 1800 UTC, (0600 FST, March 13) – RSMC Nadi transfers primary warning responsibility for Tropical Cyclone Joni to TCWC Wellington.

March 13

- 1800 UTC, (0600 FST, March 14) – TCWC Wellington reports that Tropical Cyclone Joni has weakened into a category one tropical cyclone.

March 14

- 0000 UTC, (1200 FST) – TCWC Wellington reports that Tropical Cyclone Joni has weakened into a Depression.
- 1200 UTC, (0000 FST, March 15) – The JTWC reports that Tropical Storm Joni has weakened into a tropical depression.

March 15

- 0000 UTC, (1200 FST) – TCWC Wellington issues the final warning on Depression Joni.
- 0000 UTC, (1200 FST) – RSMC Nadi reports that Tropical Disturbance 12F has formed to the southwest of Palmerston Island.

March 16

- 0000 UTC, (1200 FST) – The JTWC designates Tropical Disturbance 12F as Tropical Depression 21P.
- 1800 UTC, (0600 FST, March 16) – The JTWC reports that Tropical Disturbance 12F has intensified into a tropical storm.
- Unknown time — RSMC Nadi reports that Tropical Disturbance 12F has intensified into a tropical depression.

March 17

- 0600 UTC, (1800 FST, March 17) – RSMC Nadi reports that Tropical Depression 12F has intensified into a category 1 tropical cyclone, and names it Ken.

March 18

- 1800 UTC, (0600 FST, March 19) – RSMC Nadi reports that Tropical Cyclone Ken has intensified into a Category 2 cyclone.
- 1800 UTC, (0600 FST, March 19) – RSMC Nadi reports that Tropical Cyclone Ken has reached its peak 10-minute sustained wind speeds of 95 km/h (60 mph).
- 1800 UTC, (0600 FST, March 19) – RSMC Nadi transfers primary warning responsibility for Tropical Cyclone Ken to TCWC Wellington.
- 1800 UTC, (0600 FST, March 19) – The JTWC reports that Tropical Cyclone Ken has reached its peak 1-minute sustained wind speeds of 95 km/h (60 mph).

March 19

- 0000 UTC, (1200 FST, March 20) – TCWC Wellington reports that Tropical Cyclone Ken has weakened into a category 1 tropical cyclone.
- 1200 UTC, (0000 FST, March 20) – TCWC Wellington reports that Tropical Cyclone Ken has re-intensified into a category 2 tropical cyclone.
- 1200 UTC, (0000 FST, March 20) – TCWC Wellington reports that Tropical Cyclone Ken has reattained its 10-minute peak sustained wind speeds of 95 km/h (60 mph).
- 1800 UTC, (0600 FST, March 20) – TCWC Wellington reports that Tropical Cyclone Ken has weakened into a category 1 tropical cyclone.

March 20

- 0000 UTC, (1200 FST, March 20) – TCWC Wellington reports that Tropical Cyclone Ken has weakened into an extratropical depression.
- 0000 UTC, (1200 FST, March 20) – The JTWC reports that Tropical Cyclone Ken has weakened into an extratropical low.

March 22

- 0000 UTC, (1200 FST) – TCWC Wellington issues the final advisory on extratropical depression Ken (12P), as it moves to the east of 120°W.

March 24

- 0600 UTC, (1800 FST) – RSMC Nadi issues its first advisory on Tropical Cyclone Jasper (23P) as it moves into the South Pacific from the Australian region as a category 2 tropical cyclone.
- 0600 UTC, (1800 FST) – RSMC Nadi reports that Tropical Cyclone Jasper (23P) has reached its peak 10-minute sustained wind speeds of 95 km/h (60 mph).
- 1200 UTC, (0000 FST, March 25) — The JTWC reports that Tropical Storm Jasper (23P) has reached its peak 1-minute sustained wind speeds of 100 km/h (60 mph).

March 25

- 0000 UTC, (1200 FST) – RSMC Nadi reports that Tropical Cyclone Jasper (23P) has weakened into a category one tropical cyclone.
- 1200 UTC, (0000 FST, March 26) – RSMC Nadi reports that Tropical Cyclone Jasper (23P) has weakened into a tropical depression.
- 1200 UTC, (0000 FST, March 26) – The JTWC reports that Tropical Cyclone Jasper (23P) has weakened into a tropical depression.

March 28

- 1800 UTC, (0600 FST, March 29) – RSMC Nadi issues their final advisory on Tropical Depression Jasper (23P) as it weakens into an area of low pressure.

March 29

- 0600 UTC, (1800 FST) – RSMC Nadi reports that the remnants of Tropical Cyclone Jasper (23P) have re-intensified into a tropical disturbance.

March 30

- 0600 UTC, (1800 FST) – RSMC Nadi issues the final advisory on Tropical Disturbance Jasper (23P).

=== April ===
April 1

- 0000 UTC, (1200 FST) – RSMC Nadi reports that Tropical Disturbance 14F has formed about 325 km, (200 mi) to the north of Suva, Fiji.

April 2

- 0000 UTC, (1200 FST) – RSMC Nadi reports that Tropical Disturbance 14F has intensified into a tropical depression.

April 3

- 1800 UTC, (0600 FST, April 4) – RSMC Nadi reports that Tropical Depression 14F has intensified into a category 1 tropical cyclone.
- 2030 UTC, (0830 FST, April 4) – RSMC Nadi names Tropical Cyclone 14F as Lin.
- 1800 UTC, (0600 FST, April 4) – The JTWC designates Tropical Cyclone Lin as Tropical Depression 25P.

April 4

- 0600 UTC, (1800 FST) – RSMC Nadi reports that Tropical Cyclone Lin (25P) has intensified into a category 2 cyclone.
- 0600 UTC, (1800 FST) – The JTWC reports that Tropical Depression Lin (25P) has intensified into a tropical storm.
- 1800 UTC, (0600 FST, April 5) — RSMC Nadi reports that Tropical Cyclone Lin (25P) has reached its peak 10-minute sustained wind speeds of 110 km/h (70 mph).

April 5

- 0000 UTC, (1200 FST) – The JTWC reports that Tropical Storm Lin (25P) has reached its peak 1-minute sustained wind speeds of 100 km/h (60 mph).
- 1800 UTC, (0600 FST, April 6) — RSMC Nadi transfers the primary warning responsibility of Tropical Cyclone Lin (25P) to TCWC Wellington.

April 6

- 0000 UTC, (1200 FST) – TCWC Wellington reports that Tropical Cyclone Lin (25P) has weakened into a Depression.
- 0000 UTC, (1200 FST) – The JTWC reports that Tropical Storm Lin (25P) has weakened into a tropical depression.
- 0600 UTC, (1800 FST) – The JTWC reports that Tropical Depression Lin (25P) has weakened into a tropical disturbance.

April 8

- 0000 UTC, (1200 FST) – TCWC Wellington issues the final advisory on extratropical cyclone Lin (25P).
- 0600 UTC, (1800 FST) – RSMC Nadi reports that Tropical Disturbance 15F has formed about 450 km (280 mi) to the northeast of Honiara in the Solomon Islands.

April 10

- 1800 UTC, (0600 FST, April 6) – RSMC Nadi issues its final advisory on Tropical Disturbance 15F as it has moved into the Australian Region.

April 30

- 1200 UTC, (0000 FST, May 1) – The 2008–09 South Pacific tropical cyclone season officially ends.

== See also ==
- Atlantic hurricane seasons: 2008, 2009
- Pacific hurricane seasons: 2008, 2009
- Pacific typhoon seasons: 2008, 2009
- North Indian Ocean cyclone seasons: 2008, 2009
