= 2008–09 South Pacific cyclone season =

Tropical cyclone season

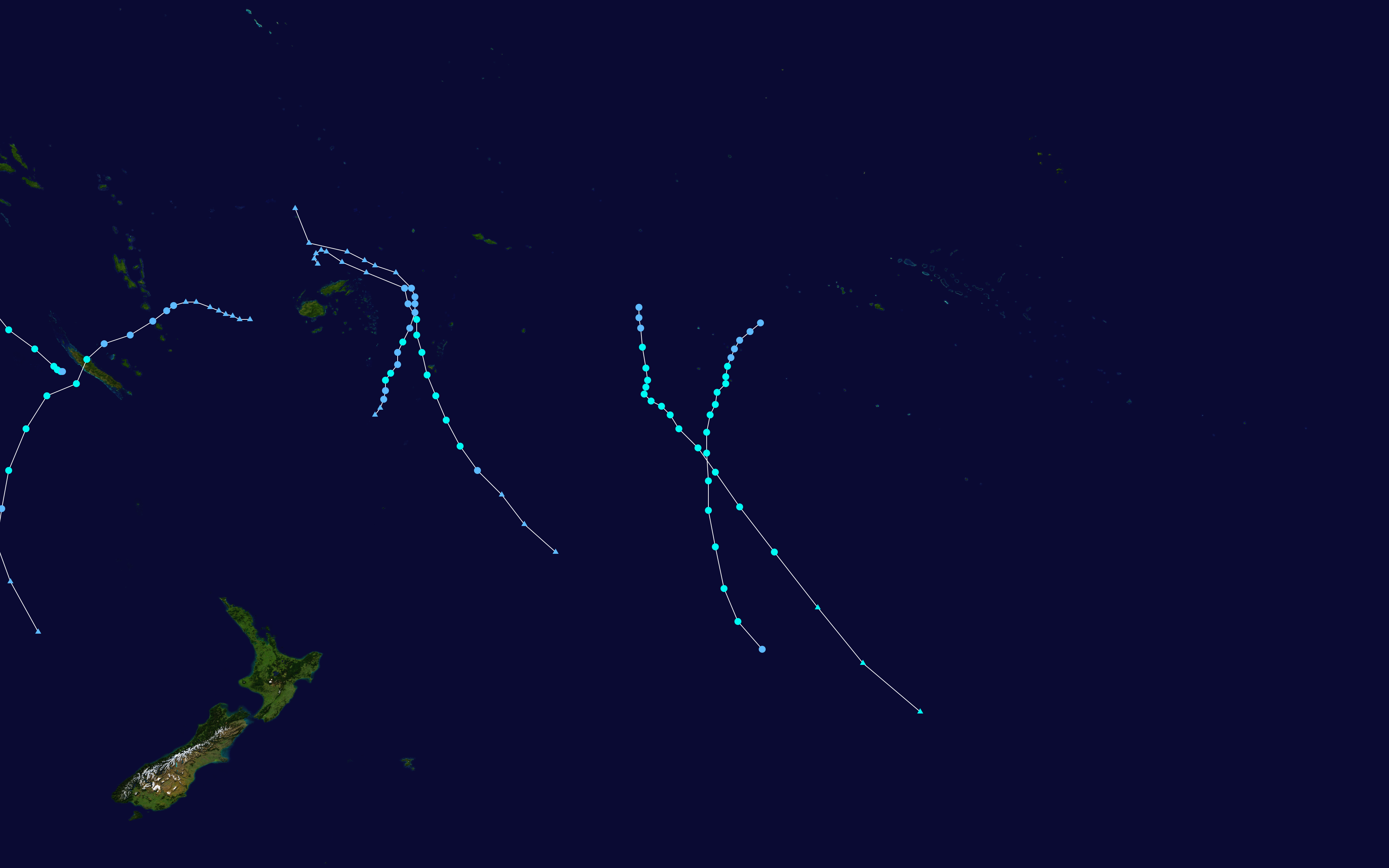
- Season summary map

Seasonal boundaries
- First system formed: 1 December 2008
- Last system dissipated: 11 April 2009

Strongest storm
- Name: Lin
  - Maximum winds: 110 km/h (70 mph) (10-minute sustained)
  - Lowest pressure: 975 hPa (mbar)

Seasonal statistics
- Total disturbances: 15
- Total depressions: 12
- Tropical cyclones: 6
- Severe tropical cyclones: 0 (record low, tied with 2024–25)
- Total fatalities: 11
- Total damage: $65 million (2009 USD)

Related articles
- Timeline of the 2008–09 South Pacific cyclone season; 2008–09 Australian region cyclone season; 2008–09 South-West Indian Ocean cyclone season

The 2008–09 South Pacific cyclone season was a below average tropical cyclone season, which featured six named tropical cyclones compared to an average of about nine. Ahead of the season officially starting on November 1, 2008, the Island Climate Update tropical cyclone outlook predicted that the season, would feature an average risk of tropical cyclones impacting the South Pacific between 160°E and 120°W. The first tropical disturbance of the season developed to the northeast of the Samoan Islands on December 1, however, it remained weak and was last noted during the next day.

== Seasonal forecasts ==
Ahead of the cyclone season formally starting on November 1, 2008, New Zealand's MetService and National Institute of Water and Atmospheric Research (NIWA), the Fiji Meteorological Service (FMS), as well as various other Pacific Meteorological services, all contributed towards the Island Climate Update tropical cyclone outlook that was released during September 2008. The outlook took into account the ENSO neutral conditions that had been observed across the Pacific, as well as analogue seasons that had a similar climate background. The outlook noted that on average eight to ten tropical cyclones occur between 135°E and 120°W during seasons, with neutral ENSO conditions. It was also predicted that there was a normal risk of tropical cyclones occurring over most of the Pacific and that the first named tropical cyclone would occur before the end of December. The outlook also assessed the risk of a tropical cyclone affecting a certain island nation or territory and noted that several tropical cyclones, usually occurred in the region between Vanuatu, New Caledonia, Fiji and Tonga. Most areas including Vanuatu, New Caledonia, Fiji, Tonga, Niue and Tuvalu, were thought to have an average risk of being impacted by one or more tropical cyclones. The Northern Cook Islands and the Tuamotu Islands were thought to have reduced risk, while it was thought unlikely that Pitcairn Island, Kiribati and the Marquesas would be impacted by a tropical cyclone.

During January 2009, a revised Island Climate Update tropical cyclone outlook was issued, which stated that La Niña conditions had redeveloped in the tropical Pacific and were expected to persist. As a result, they noted that on average six or seven tropical cyclones, could be expected to develop over the Pacific Ocean, during a season characterised by a weak La Niña. They also noted that the risk of a tropical cyclone impacting a certain island nation or territory had changed with an increased risk for areas to the west of the International Date Line. In particular, the Solomon Islands, Vanuatu, New Zealand, New Caledonia now had an increased risk, while Fiji had a variable risk of being affected by one or more tropical cyclones. The Northern Cook Islands, Tonga, Niue, Wallis and Futuna, Samoa and Tokelau were thought to have a reduced risk of being impacted, while other areas such as the Southern Cook Islands, Tuvalu and Papua New Guinea had an average risk of being affected by a tropical cyclone.

== Season summary ==
During the season, a total of fifteen significant tropical disturbances were monitored and numbered by the Fiji Meteorological Service (FMS), within the South Pacific basin between 160°E and 120°W. Off these tropical disturbances, six became named tropical cyclones, while none developed into severe tropical cyclones for the first time since the 1994–95 season. The first tropical disturbance of the season developed on December 1, while the final system Tropical Disturbance 15F was last noted in the basin during April 10.

Notable systems include Tropical Depression 04F, which caused Fiji's second worst natural disaster at the time. Tropical Depression 08F, which intensified into Cyclone Hettie, was the first tropical cyclone to form during the season. Tropical Depression 10F brought heavy rains to Vanuatu and before making landfall on New Caledonia intensified into Tropical Cyclone Innis. After it made landfall, Innis became the first Tropical Depression to move into TCWC Brisbane's Area of responsibility since Cyclone Larry. Cyclones Joni and Ken both threatened the Southern Cook Islands however they only delivered minimal impacts. Cyclone Jasper then moved into the region early on March 24 at peak intensity, having developed inside TCWC Brisbane's area of responsibility two days earlier. The final named storm to develop during the season was Tropical Cyclone Lin, near the Lau Group of Fiji and Tonga.

== Systems ==
=== Tropical Depression 02F ===
- Tropical depression (Australian scale)
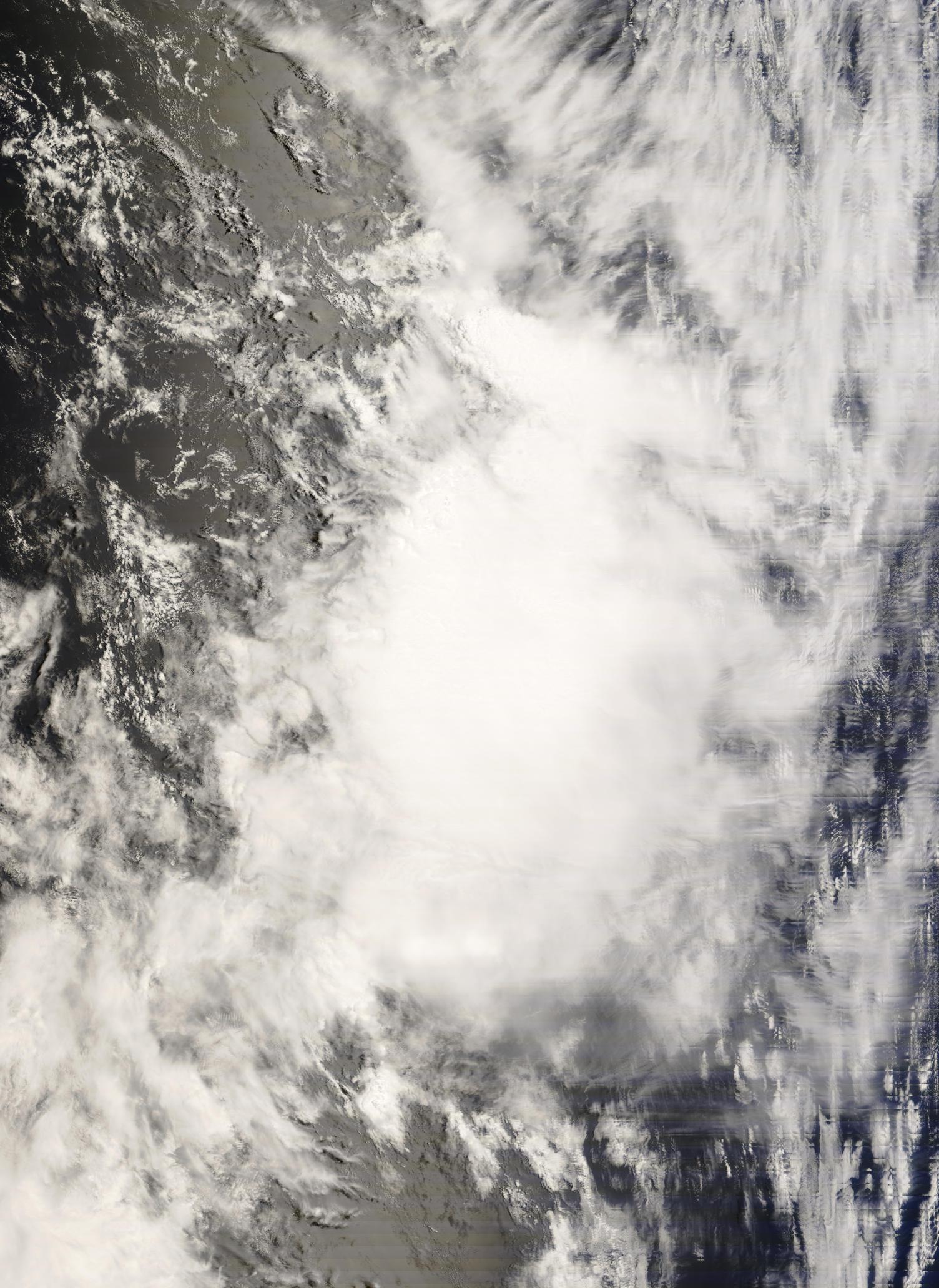
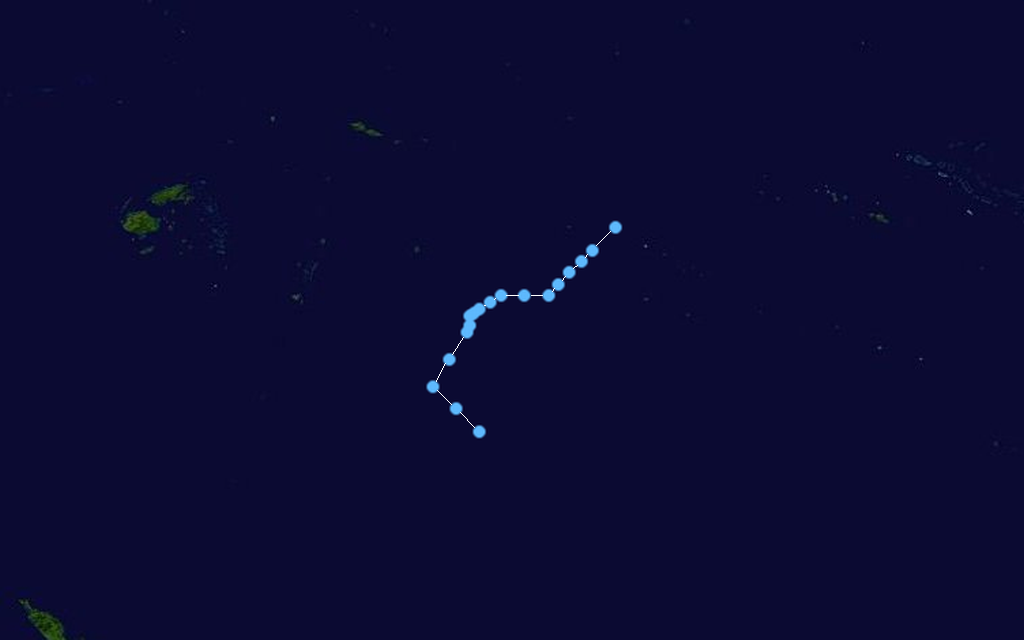
- Duration: December 3 – December 6
- Peak intensity: 45 km/h (30 mph) (10-min); 1004 hPa (mbar)

Early on December 3, RSMC Nadi reported that a Tropical Disturbance had formed near the Southern Cook Islands and was located in a moderately sheared environment and was moving towards the southeast. Deep Convection had been present around a well-defined cyclonic circulation for the previous 24 hours. Over the next day the disturbance gradually developed with RSMC Nadi upgrading it to a Tropical Depression later that day whilst it was moving between Niue and the Southern Cook Islands. Over the next couple of days the depression gradually weakened with convection which was located in the southern and eastern quadrants became sheared and the low level circulation centre became exposed as it moved into an area of cooler sea surface temperatures. Late on December 6 RSMC Nadi issued their final advisory on the depression as it moved into TCWC Wellingtons area of responsibility and was expected to become a mid latitude low-pressure system within 12 hours.

=== Tropical Depression 04F ===
- Tropical depression (Australian scale)
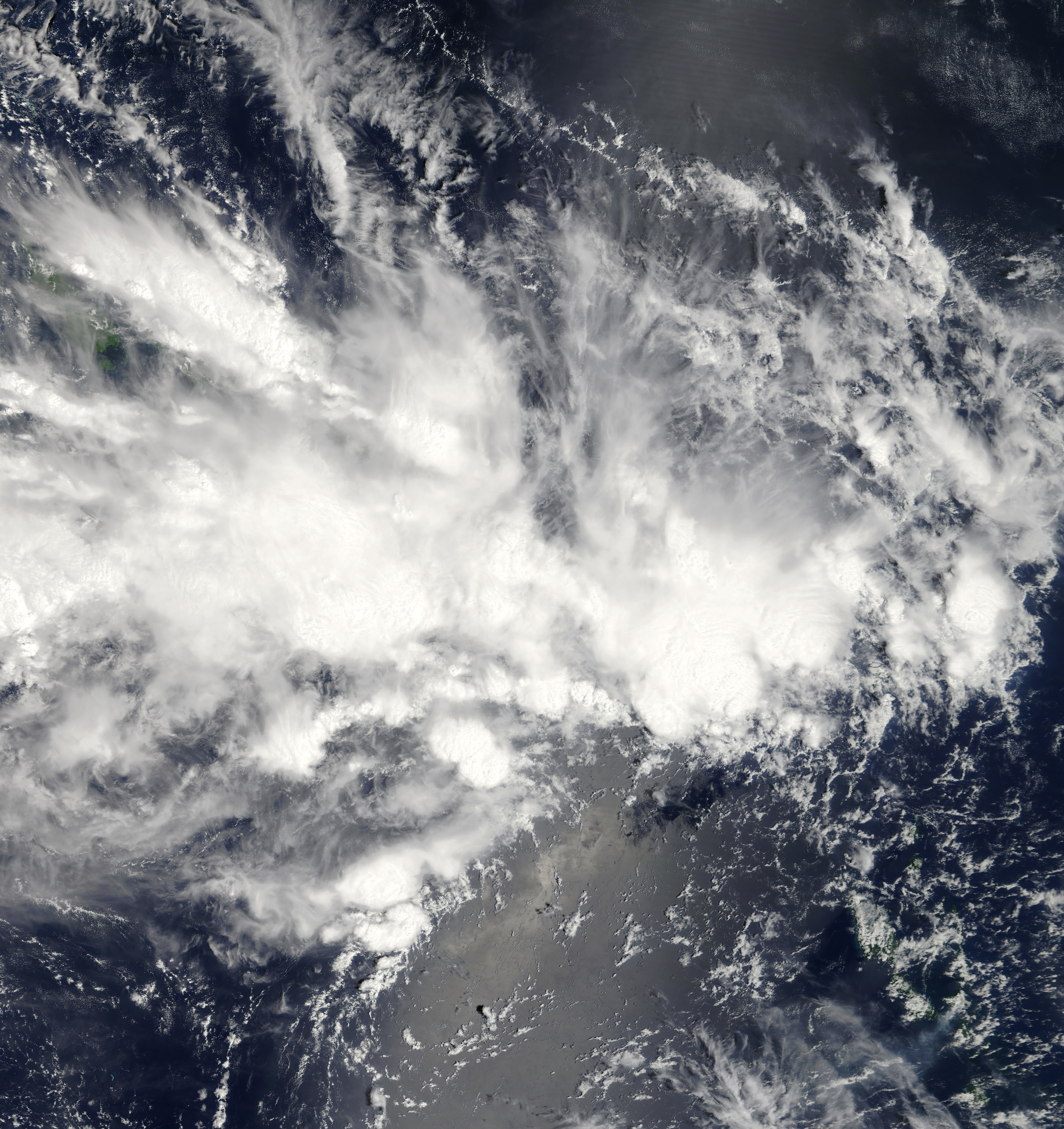
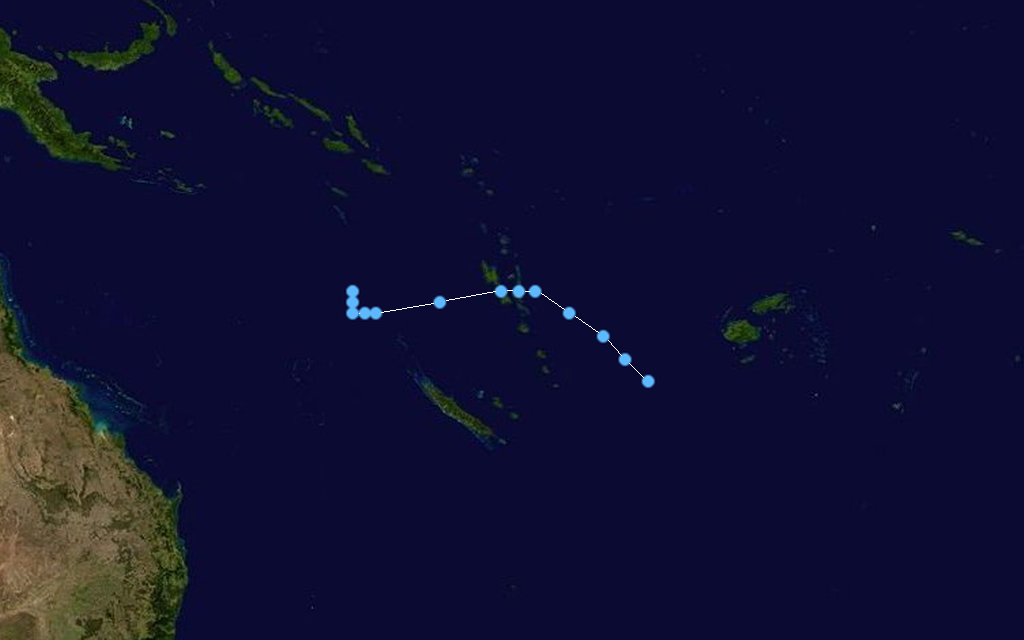
- Duration: January 4 – January 12
- Peak intensity: 65 km/h (40 mph) (10-min); 994 hPa (mbar)

On January 4, the FMS reported that Tropical Depression 04F had developed within a low to moderate area of vertical windshear, about 815 km (505 mi) to the northeast of Port Vila in Vanuatu. At this stage the system's low to mid-level circulation centre was poorly organised and exposed while atmospheric convection was displaced to the north of the system.

Over the next couple of days the depression moved towards the southeast, before on January 8 as it started to bring heavy rainfall to Fiji. RSMC Nadi then issued their final advisory on it later that day, as it was now an extratropical depression. However, late the next day RSMC Nadi started to reissue advisories on the depression and immediately passed primary warning responsibility for it to the Tropical Cyclone Warning Center in Wellington, who issued warnings on the depression until early on January 12 when they issued their last advisory.

Floods and mudslides caused by the depression killed at least eleven people in Fiji. Several towns and rural areas on Viti Levu were flooded.

=== Tropical Depression 05F ===
- Tropical depression (Australian scale)
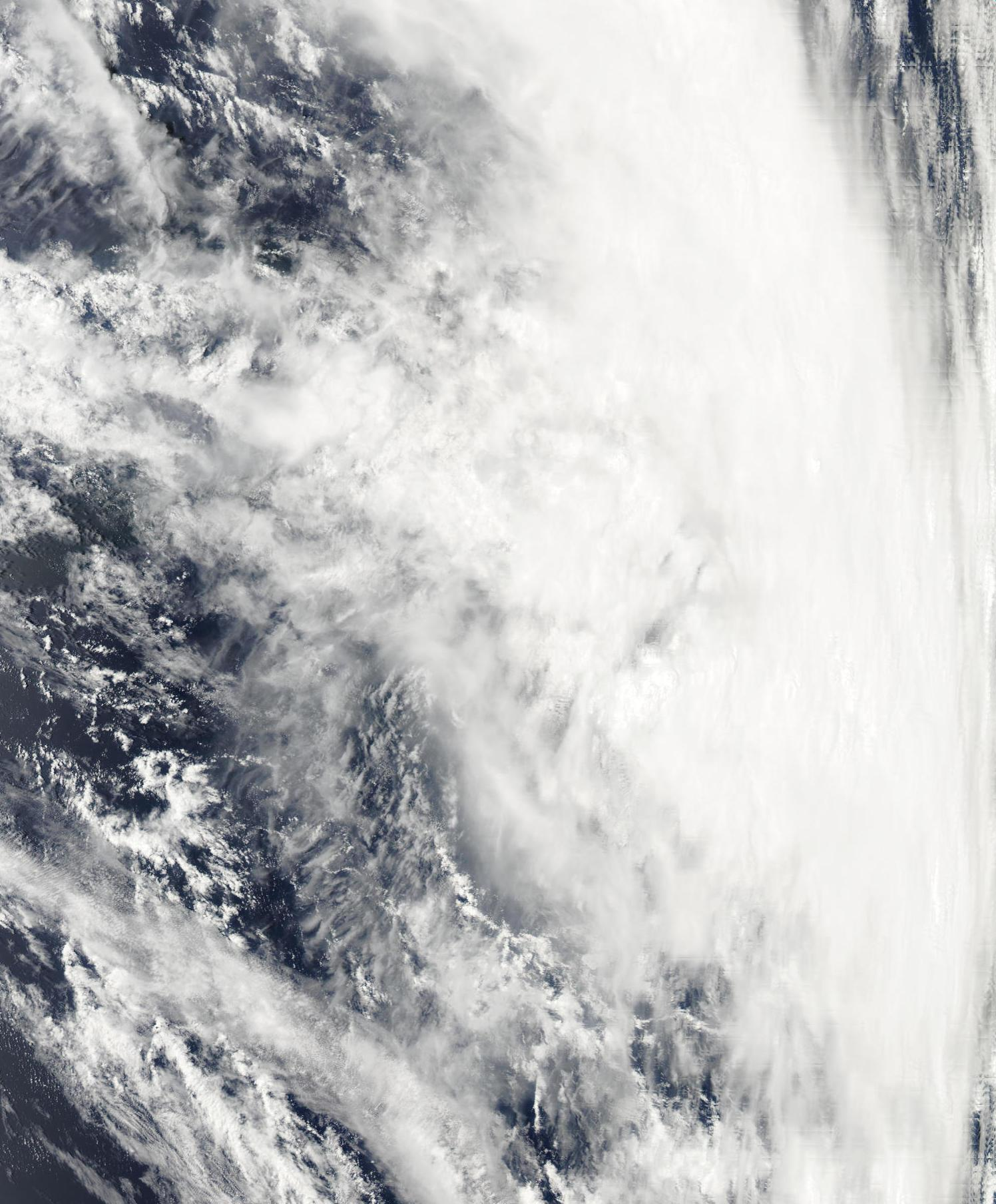
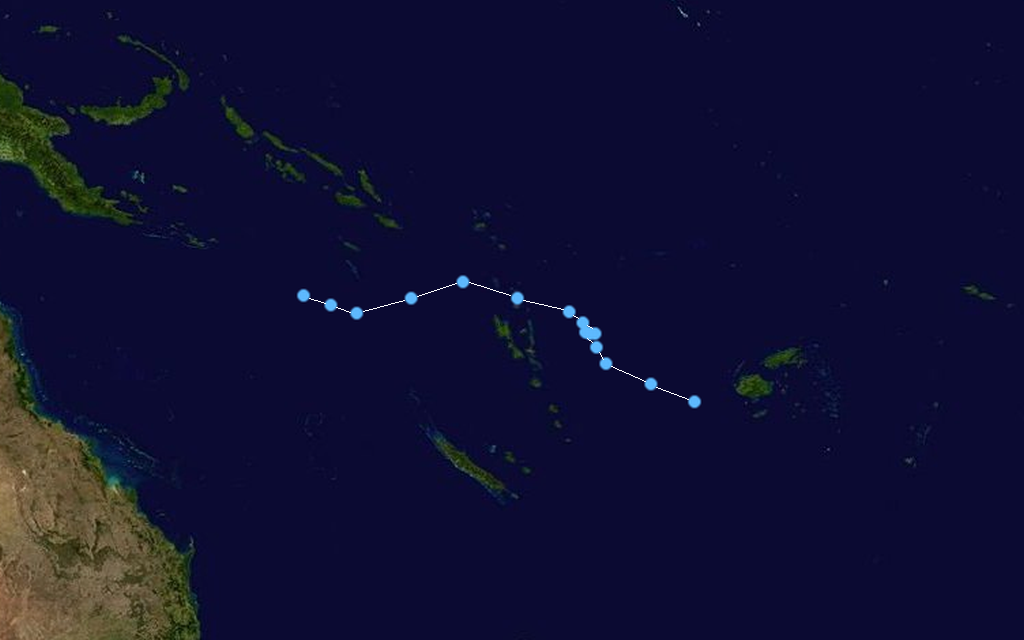
- Duration: January 11 – January 14
- Peak intensity: 55 km/h (35 mph) (10-min); 999 hPa (mbar)

On January 11, RSMC Nadi reported that a tropical depression had formed to the south of the Solomon Islands and was just inside TCWC Brisbane's area of responsibility, and started issuing Tropical Disturbance Summaries on it. As the depression moved into RSMC Nadi's area of responsibility it was designated as 05F. Nadi reported at this time that whilst the depression had a low to moderate chance of forming into a tropical cyclone within 48 hours, there was an upper trough of low pressure that could provide an opportunity for the depression to either rapidly or explosively develop. Despite fair conditions, it dissipated without ever becoming a cyclone.

=== Tropical Depression 06F ===
- Tropical depression (Australian scale)
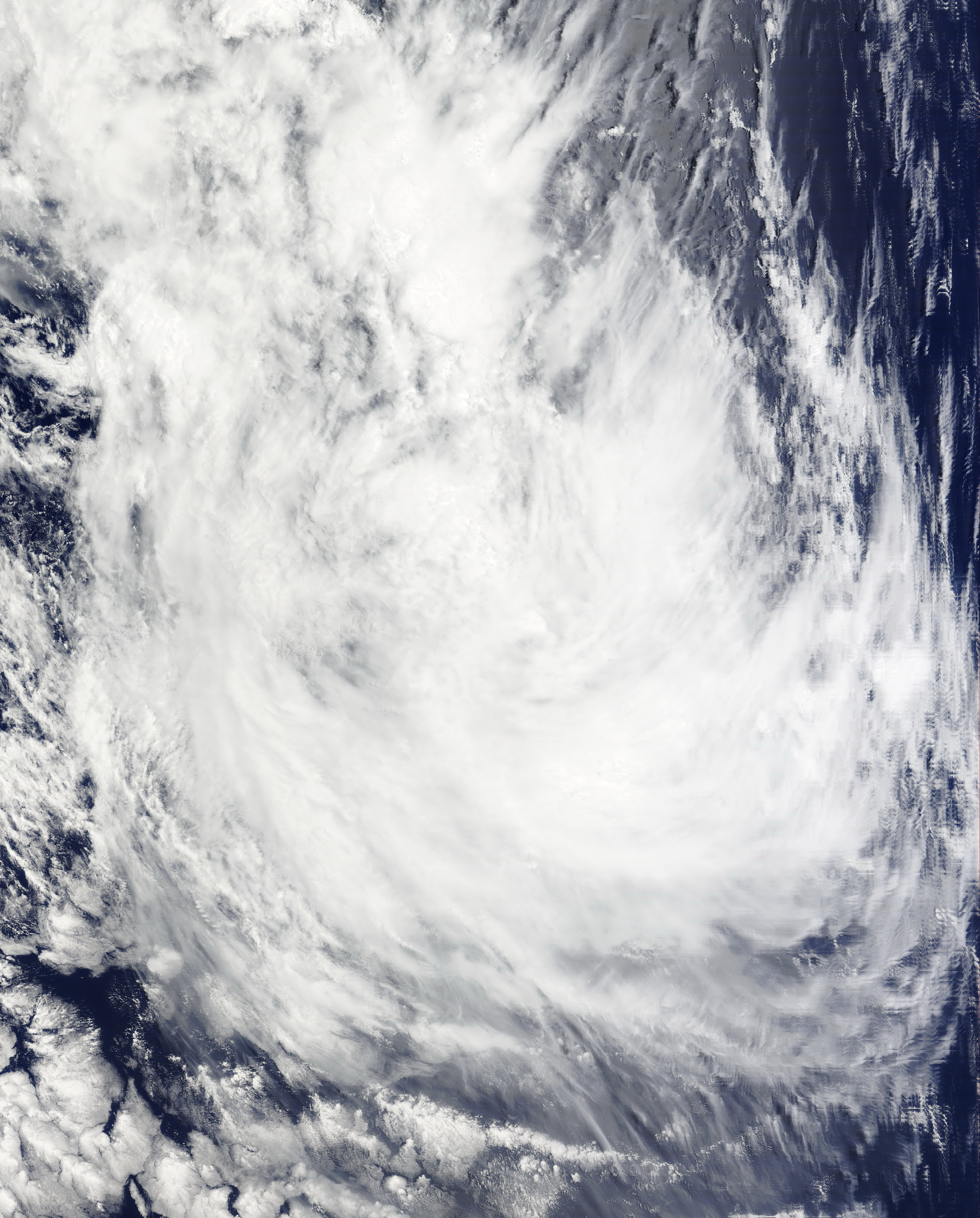
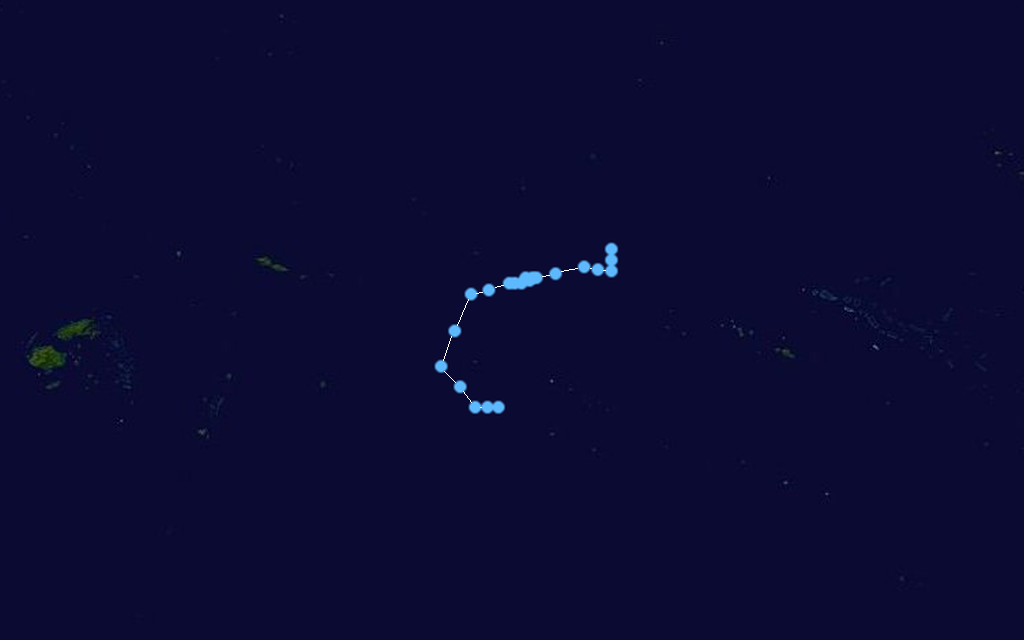
- Duration: January 19 – January 23
- Peak intensity: 55 km/h (35 mph) (10-min); 1005 hPa (mbar)

Late on January 19, RSMC Nadi reported that a tropical disturbance had formed in a monsoonal trough of low pressure about 940 km to the north west of Papeete, in French Polynesia. Convection was confined to the northeast of the low level circulation and was disorganised. Late the next day whilst the disturbance was moving to the east and into an area of higher vertical wind shear, RSMC Nadi upgraded the disturbance to a tropical depression despite its low level circulation centre being exposed and lying to the west of the deep convection. During the next morning as it interacted with another disturbance to the northwest the depression reached its peak wind speeds of 55 km/h (34 mph) Over the next couple of days th depression moved towards the south before late on January 23 RSMC Nadi issued their final advisory on the depression as it was expected to become a hybrid system within 24 hours.

=== Tropical Depression 07F ===
- Tropical depression (Australian scale)
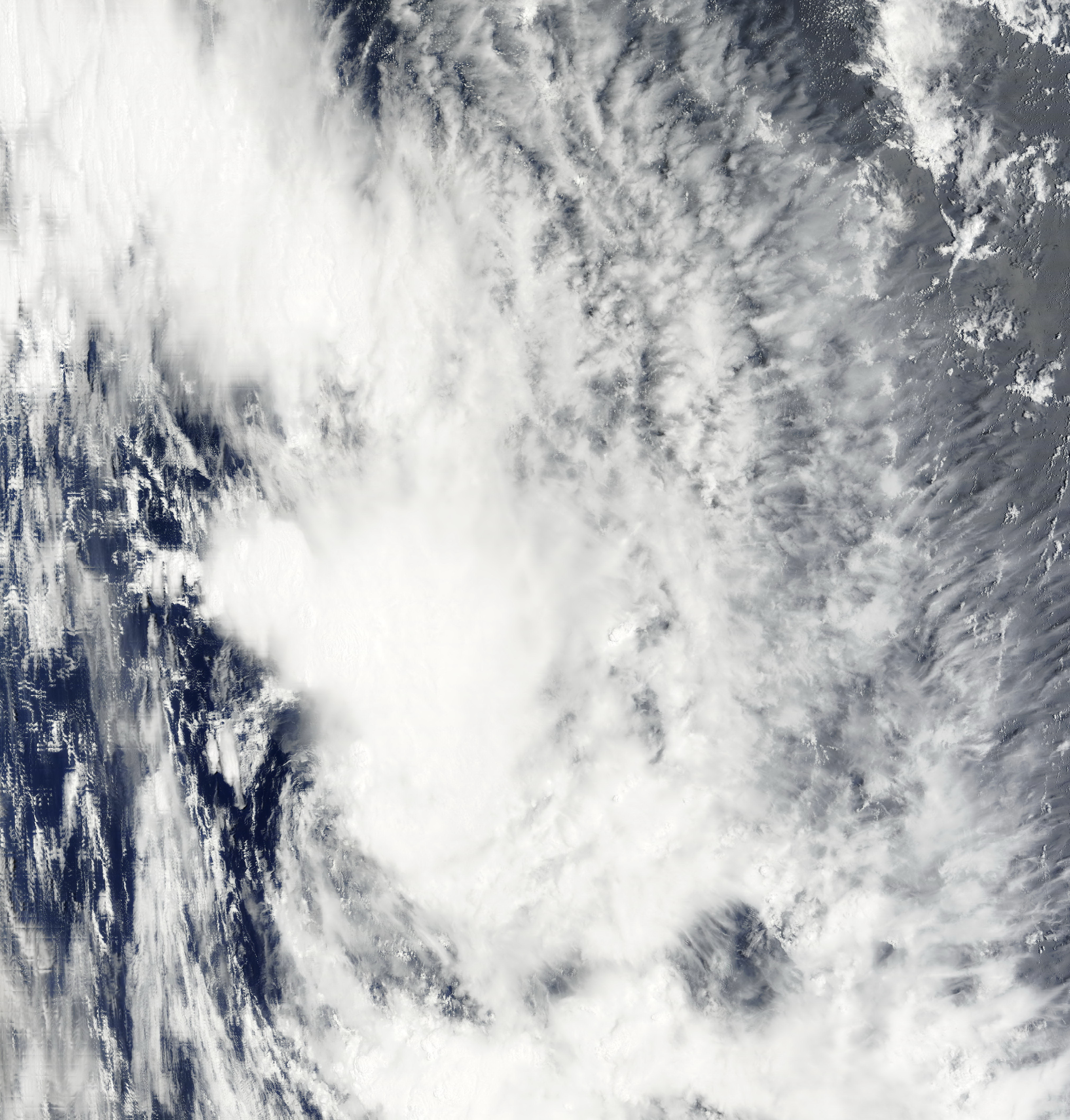
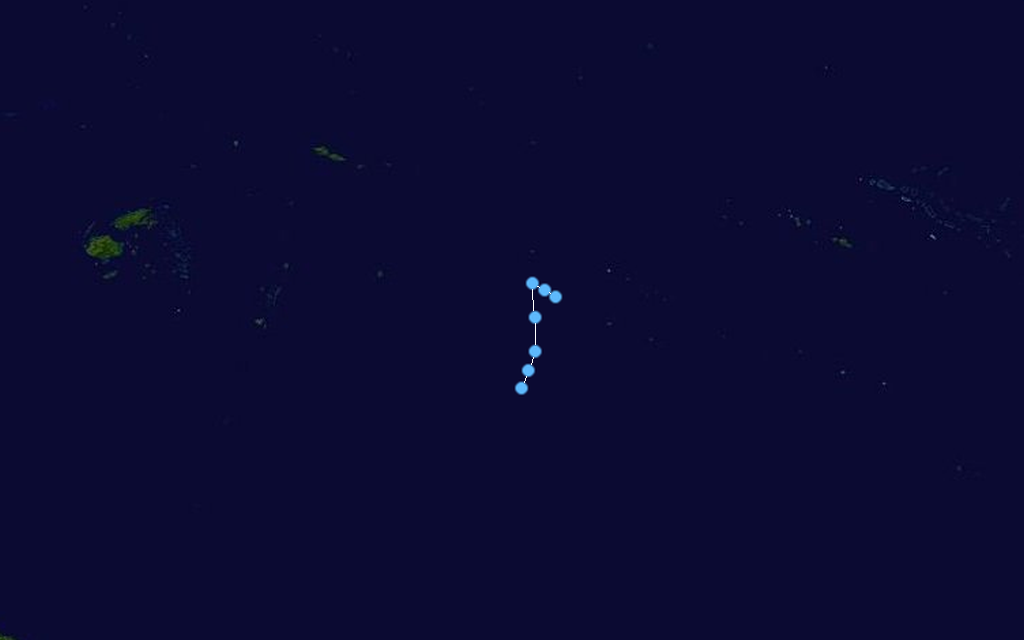
- Duration: January 23 – January 25
- Peak intensity: 65 km/h (40 mph) (10-min); 1006 hPa (mbar)

On January 23, RSMC Nadi reported that a Tropical Depression had formed, to the southwest of American Samoa. Later that day as the Depression moved towards the east they downgraded the Depression to a Tropical Disturbance as the Low Level Circulation Center was exposed and located in an environment of moderate to strong vertical wind shear. During the morning of January 24 the Tropical Disturbance was reupgraded to a Tropical Depression and assigned the Tropical Depression the designation of 07F. Later that day the tropical depression reached its peak wind speeds of 65 km/h (40 mph). Early the next day RSMC Nadi released their final Tropical Disturbance Summary as the Tropical Depression had lost all tropical characteristics.

=== Tropical Cyclone Hettie ===
- Category 1 tropical cyclone (Australian scale)
- Tropical storm (SSHWS)
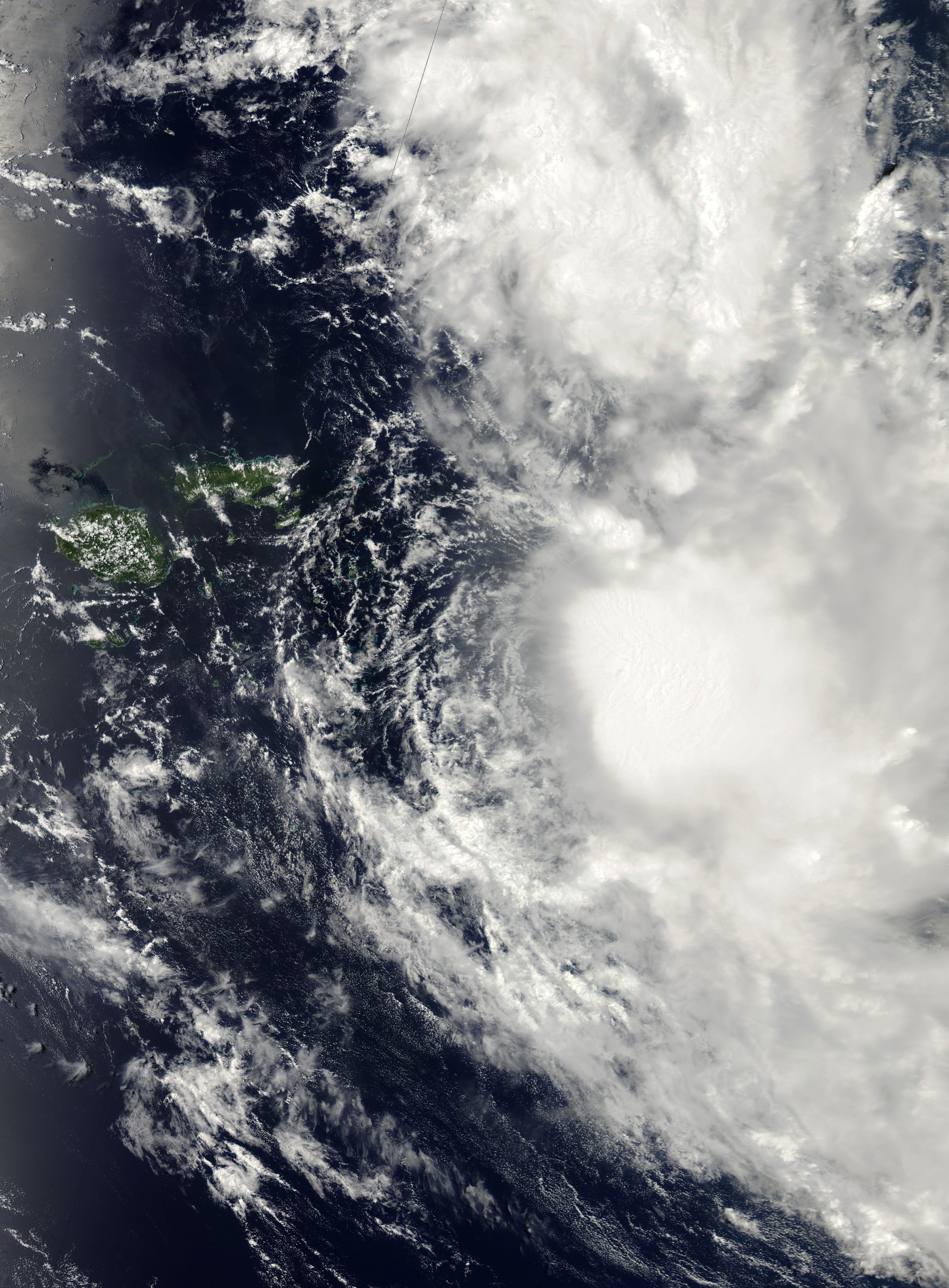
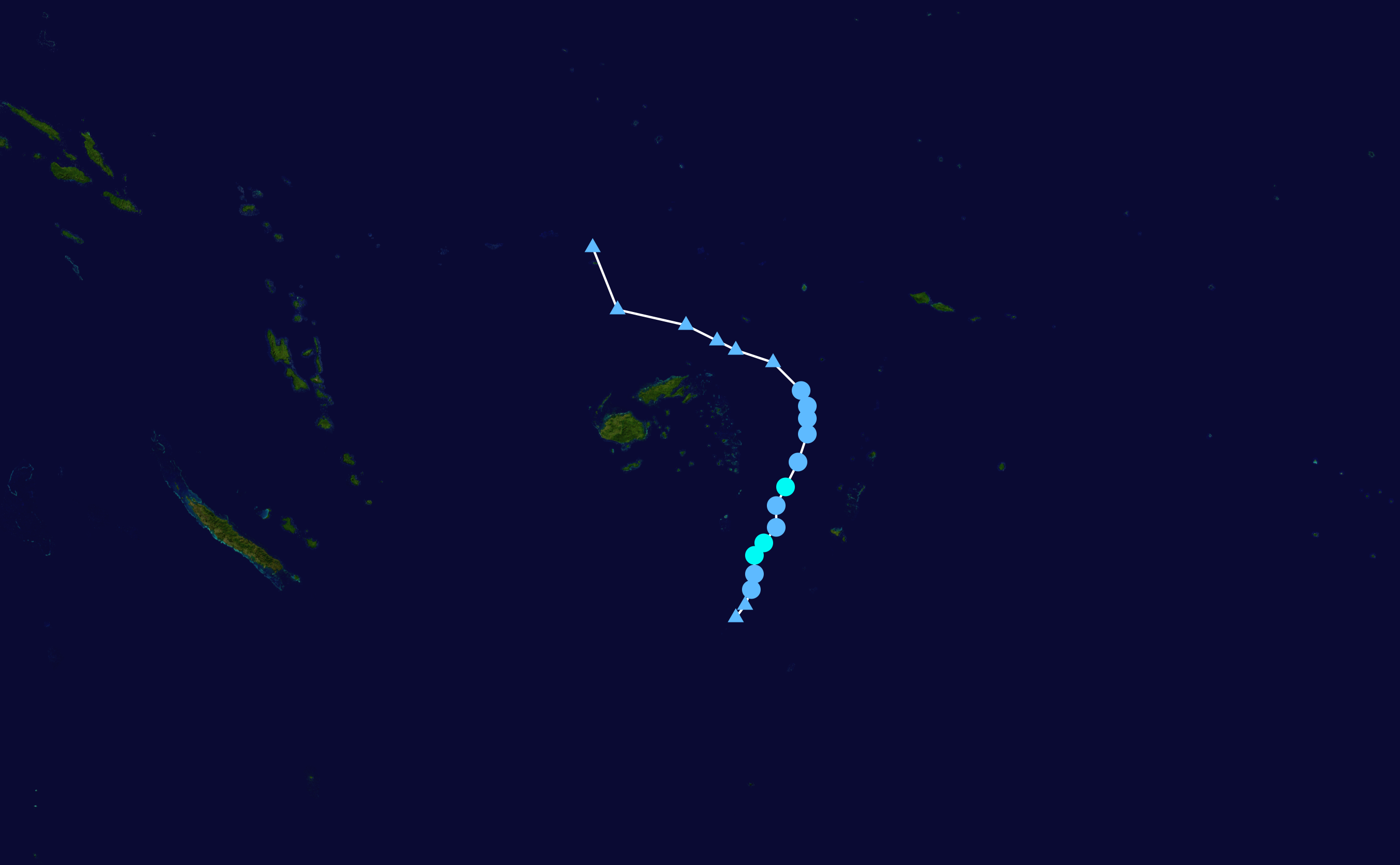
- Duration: January 24 – January 31
- Peak intensity: 65 km/h (40 mph) (10-min); 995 hPa (mbar)

On January 24, RSMC Nadi reported that Tropical Disturbance 08F had developed within the monsoon trough and an area of minimal vertical windshear to the north of the Fijian dependency Rotuma. During the next day the disturbance moved towards the southeast and developed into a tropical depression while it was located near Rotuma. Over the next 3 days, the depression continued to move south-eastwards between Fiji and Tonga while intensifying slowly against stronger vertical windshear. before RSMC Nadi and the JTWC reported that the depression had developed into a tropical cyclone during January 28.

Cyclone Hettie did not directly affect any inhabited land areas.

=== Tropical Depression 09F ===
- Tropical depression (Australian scale)
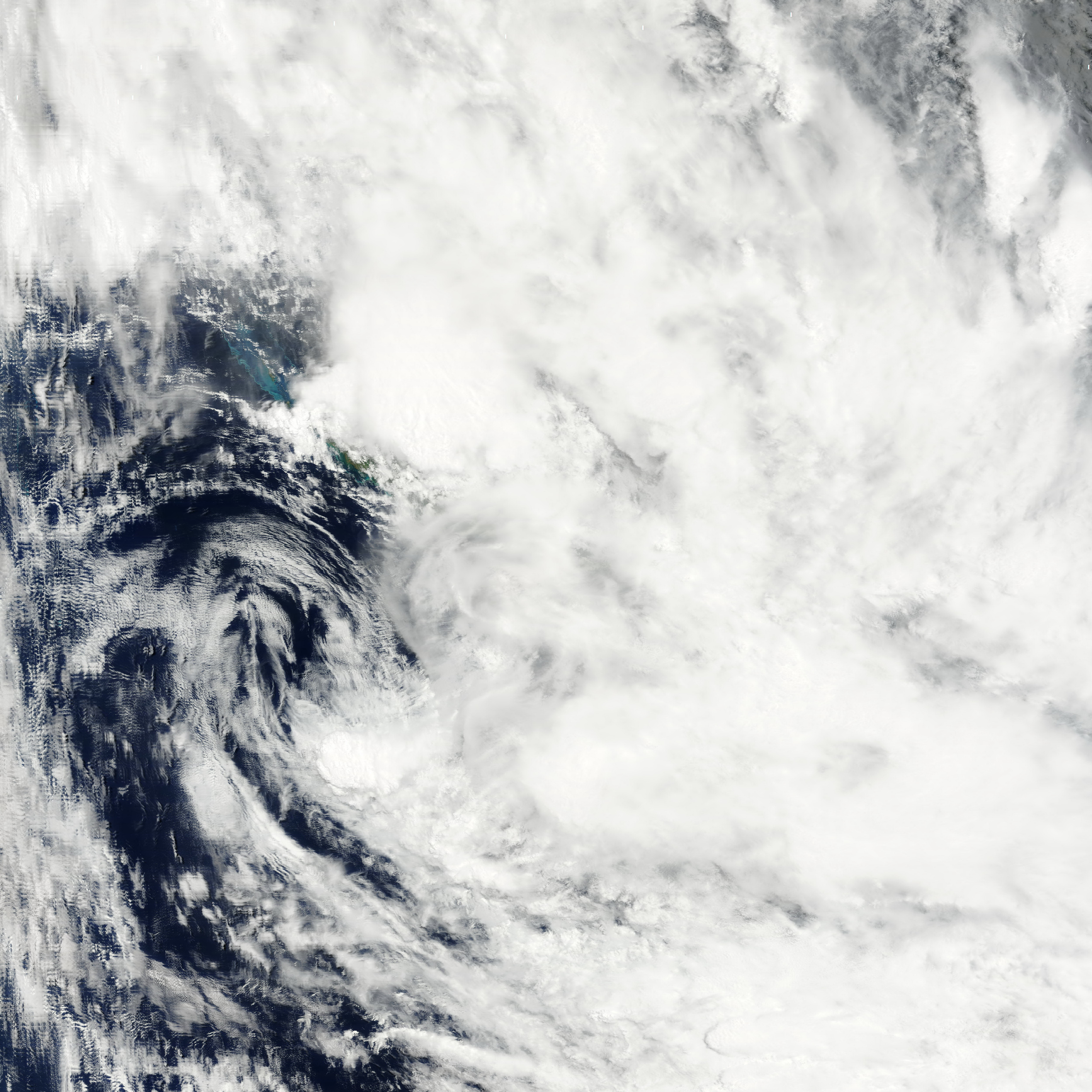
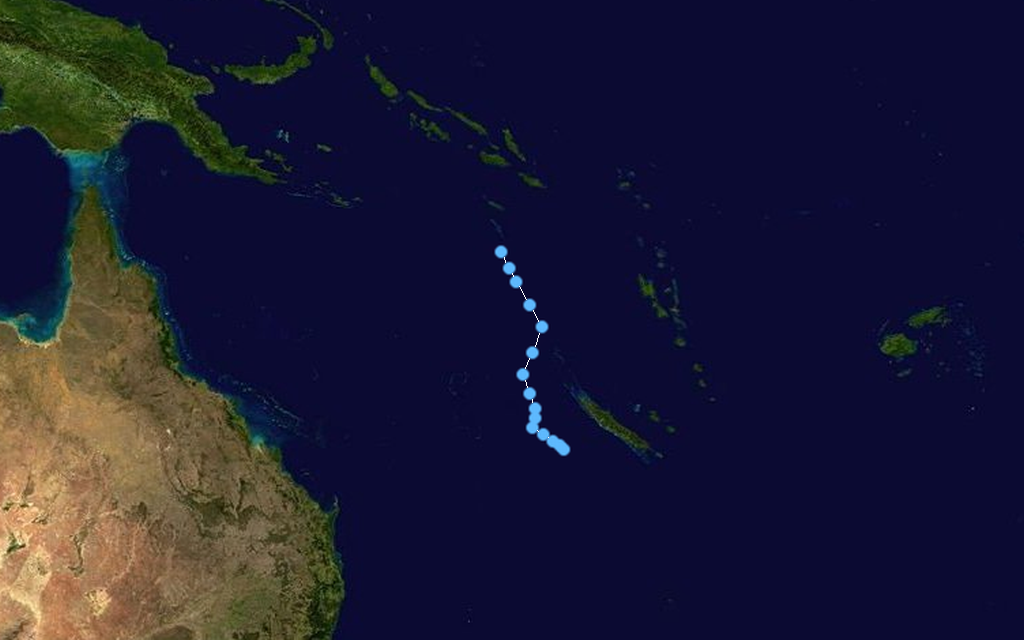
- Duration: February 1 – February 5
- Peak intensity: 55 km/h (35 mph) (10-min); 998 hPa (mbar)

On February 1, RSMC Nadi reported that Tropical Depression 09F had developed within the monsoon trough about 575 km (355 mi) to the northeast of Port Vila, Vanuatu.

Late on February 1, a Tropical disturbance formed about 645 km (401 mi) to the west of Vanuatu and was embedded in a monsoonal trough. It quickly organized itself and thus later that day, it was upgraded to Tropical Depression 09F. At this time the Low Level Circulation Center was exposed as strong vertical wind shear and deep convection was displaced to the north of Low Level Circulation Center. The next morning the JTWC reported that deep convection, was located over the western boundary, of the depression's low level circulation center. Strong shear also still existed over the system, with deep convection still being displaced to the north of the system. The next morning RSMC Nadi reported that the Low Level Circulation Center was obscured with indications of good inflow bands flowing into the depression from the north and west.

Early on February 5, RSMC Nadi issued its final advisory on the depression, as the systems low level circulation centre had become sheared and exposed.

=== Tropical Cyclone Innis ===
- Category 1 tropical cyclone (Australian scale)
- Tropical storm (SSHWS)
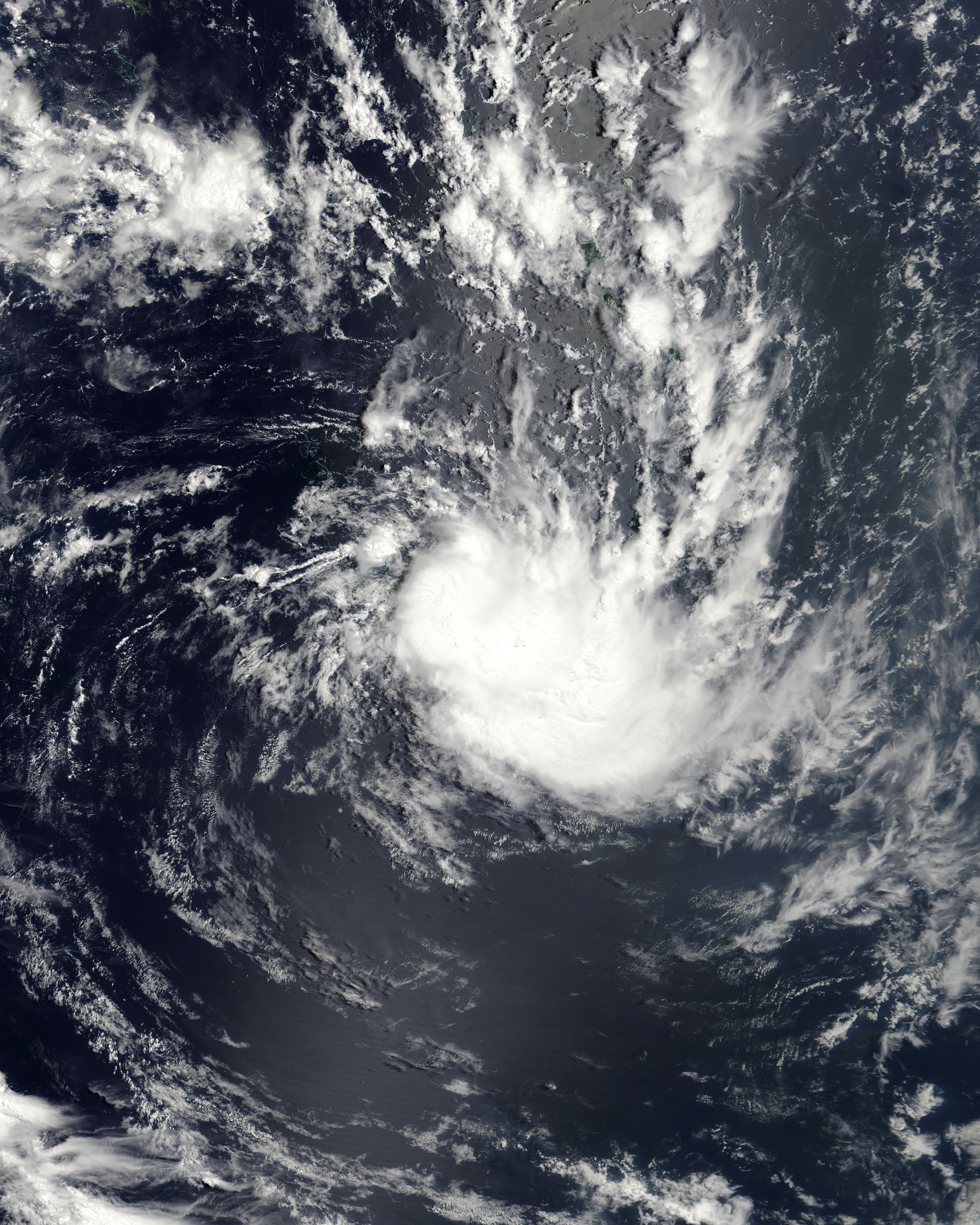
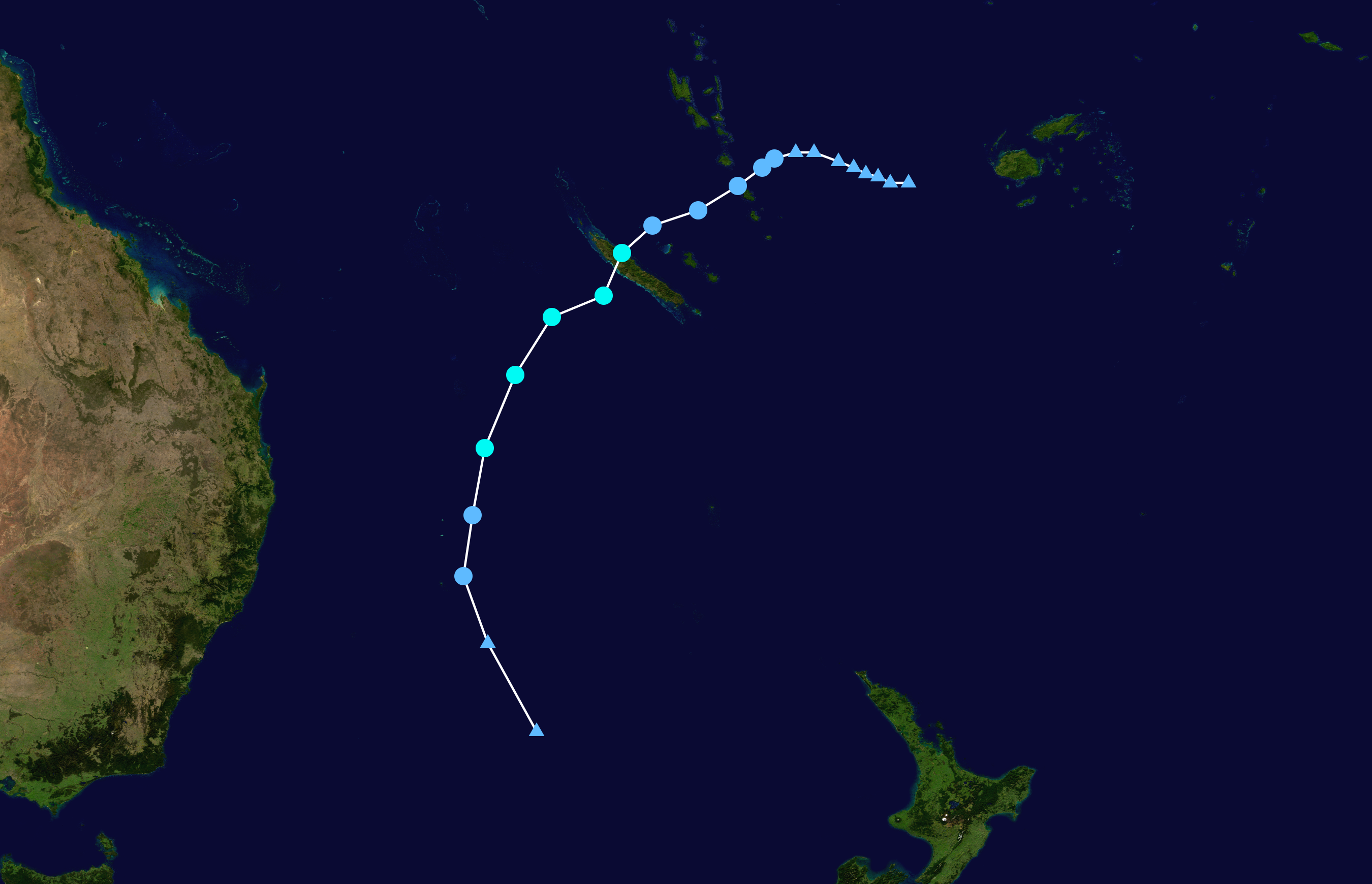
- Duration: February 13 – February 18
- Peak intensity: 75 km/h (45 mph) (10-min); 990 hPa (mbar)

On February 13, the FMS reported that Tropical Depression 10F had developed within an active convergence zone, about halfway between Fiji and Vanuatu. Over the next two days, the system gradually developed further as it moved westwards, before it passed over Vanuatu during February 15, with hostile environmental conditions influencing the depression's chance of becoming a tropical cyclone. As 10F left Vanuatu, the system turned towards the southwest and started to move towards New Caledonia, as outflow over the depression developed, while atmospheric convection started to wrap around the centre. During February 16, as the system approached New Caledonia, the FMS issued their final advisory as future prospects of the system becoming a tropical cyclone, were being undermined by increasing vertical windshear and land interaction. However, during the next day, the FMS resumed issuing advisories on the depression after it had crossed New Caledonia and moved into an area of low vertical windshear. Later that day after the system had become a Category 1 tropical cyclone on the Australian Scale, the FMS named it Innis, while the JTWC initiated advisories on the system and designated it as Tropical Cyclone 15P.

After a brief period of further development, both the JTWC and the FMS reported that Innis had peaked with sustained windspeeds of 75 km/h (45 mph), before vertical windshear over the system increased as an upper-level low encroached on Innis from the west. Later that day the primary responsibility for warnings was passed to MetService, as the system moved below 25°S and into their area of responsibility. Innis was subsequently declared an extratropical cyclone early on February 18, as it briefly moved into the Australian region and MetService issued their first warning. The system was subsequently absorbed by a low that was moving between Australia and New Zealand, and had caused flooding within the Australian state of New South Wales. There was no significant damage reported within New Caledonia, after Innis had affected the island and dropped over 100 mm (3.9 in) of rainfall. During February 19–20, the low containing Innis remnants brought high winds, heavy rain and some minor flooding to several parts off New Zealand including from Auckland to Stewart Island. The heaviest rain was recorded in Taranaki, Canterbury and Otago, while 1 indirect death was reported after a car rolled over near Opotiki.

=== Tropical Cyclone Joni ===
- Category 2 tropical cyclone (Australian scale)
- Tropical storm (SSHWS)
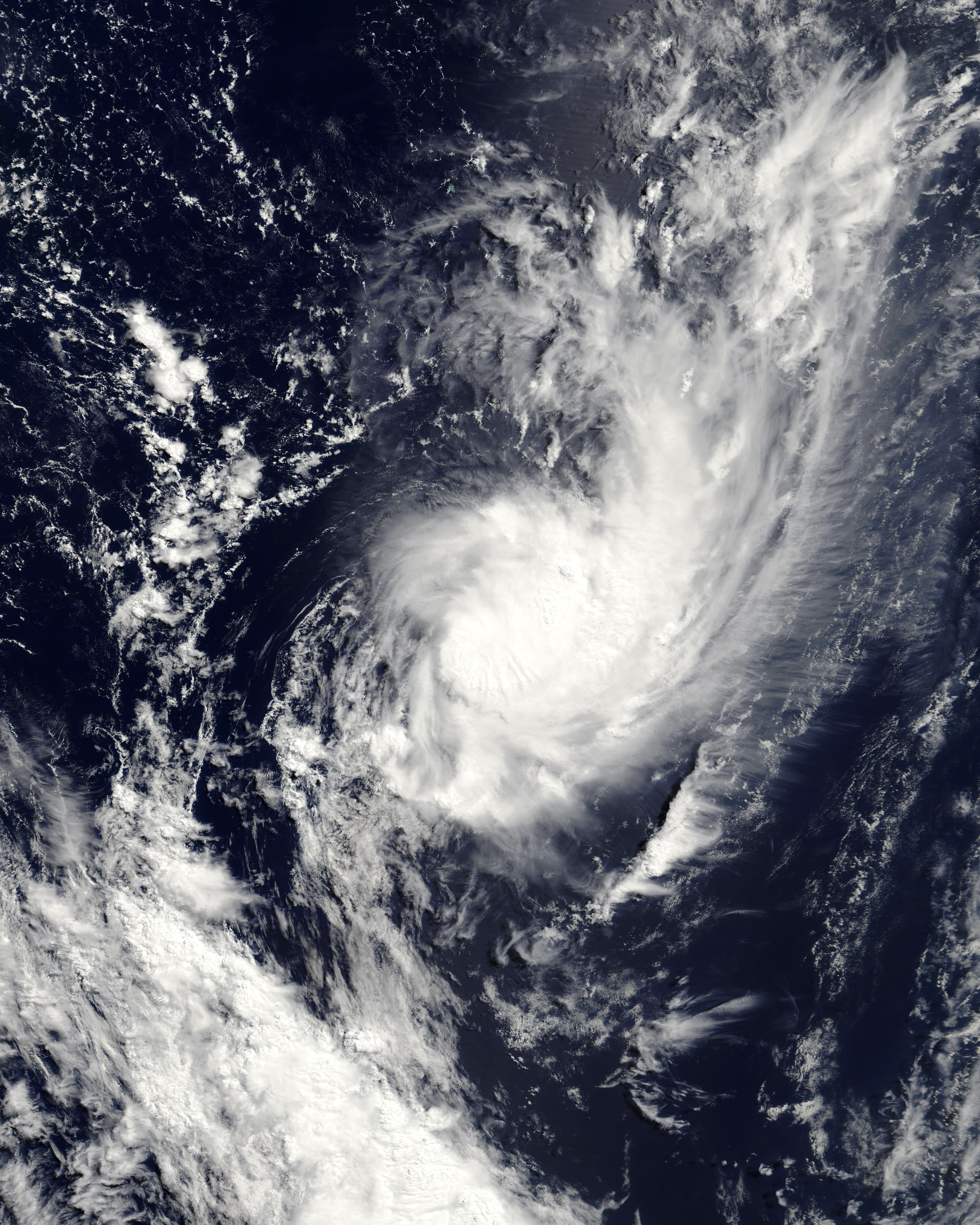
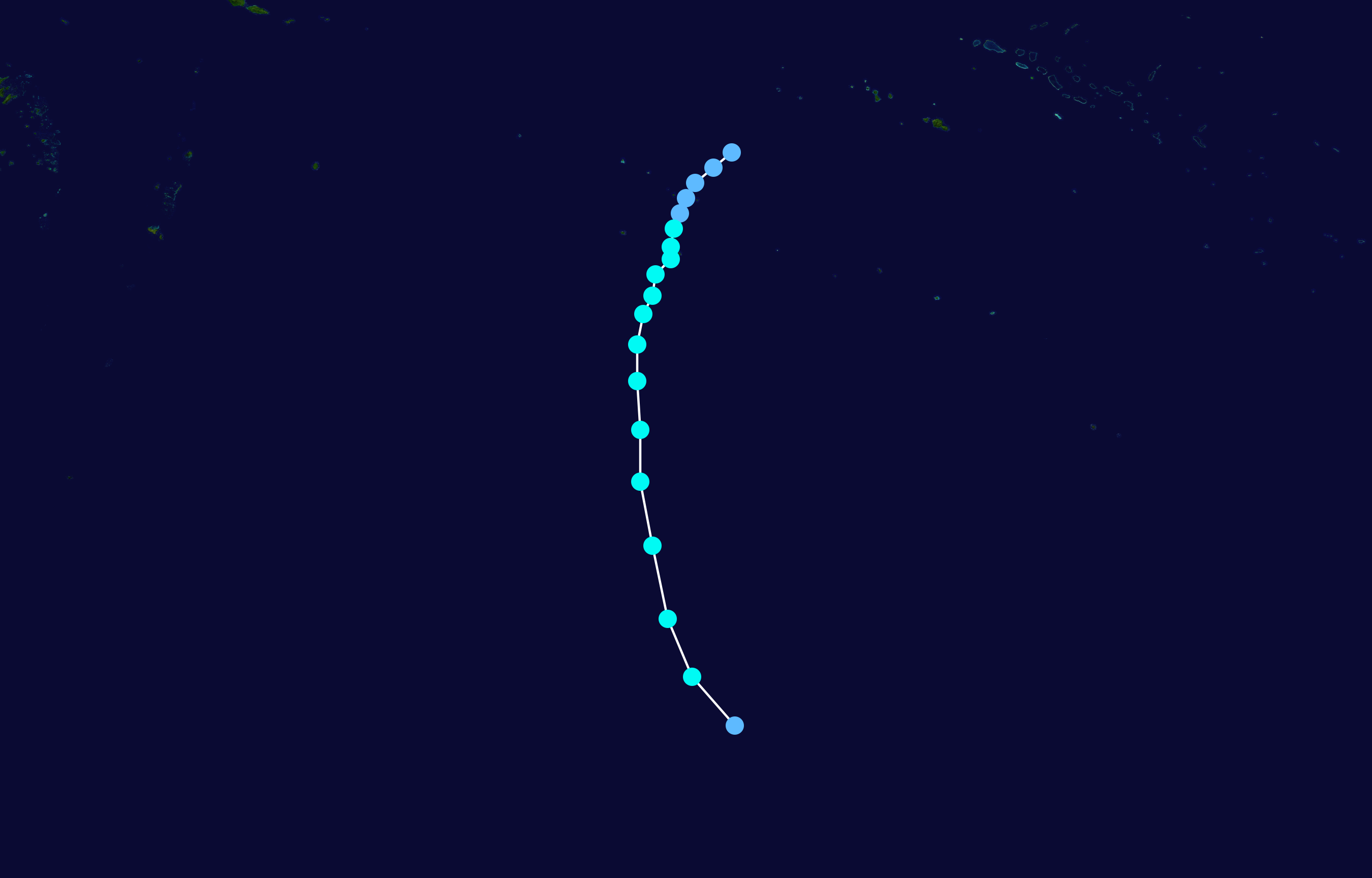
- Duration: March 10 – March 14
- Peak intensity: 100 km/h (65 mph) (10-min); 980 hPa (mbar)

On March 10, the FMS reported that Tropical Depression 11F had developed out of an area of low pressure that had spun down from the upper levels of the troposphere, about 380 km (235 mi) to the northeast of Rarotonga in the Southern Cook Islands. During the next day, shear decreased sufficiently to allow significant overall development. On the evening of the 11th, with the system moving into minimal shear, and outflow aloft becoming well-established, its probability of becoming a tropical cyclone in the next 12 hours was raised to high. At 111200 UTC, it was named Joni with 35 knots close to the centre and whilst located about 40 nautical miles west-northwest of Mangaia and about 70 miles east-southeast of Rarotonga. With favourable conditions, the cyclone continued to intensify and attained storm intensity 18 hours later. Joni reached peak intensity as it neared 25 South latitude, the Nadi and Wellington border. Wellington accepted primary responsibility for further warnings beginning at 130000 UTC as the cyclone moved into their area of responsibility. Joni remained a cyclone for another day before it was downgraded to a low. As Joni was a small and compact system only minimal impact was reported in the Southern Cook Islands while some heavy rainfall was reported in Mangaia.

=== Tropical Cyclone Ken ===
- Category 2 tropical cyclone (Australian scale)
- Tropical storm (SSHWS)
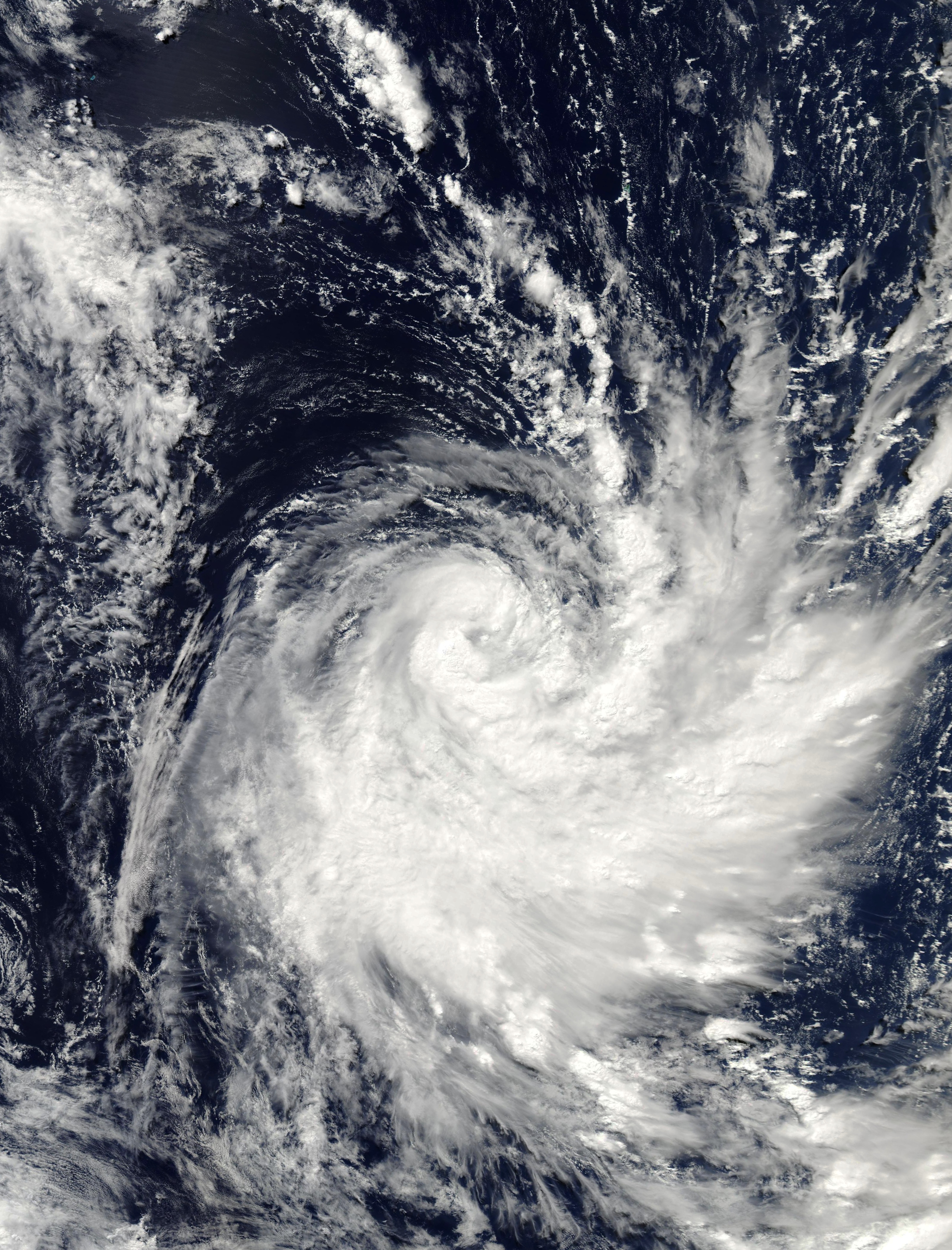
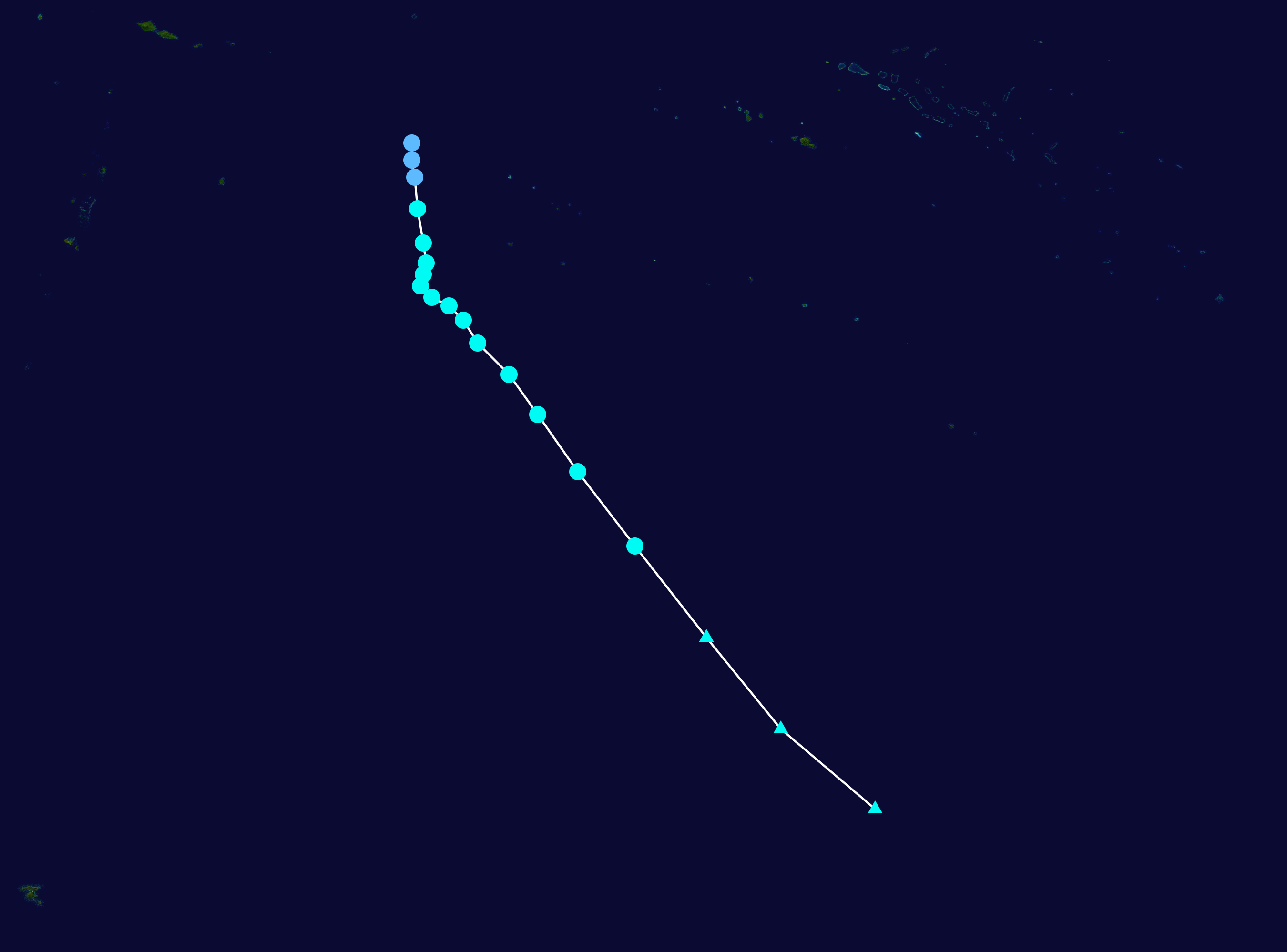
- Duration: March 16 – March 19
- Peak intensity: 95 km/h (60 mph) (10-min); 985 hPa (mbar)

Early on March 16, a tropical disturbance formed to the south of a convergence zone which was located to the east of Palmerston Island, in the Cook Islands. Early that afternoon the JTWC reported that the disturbances low level circulation centre had rapidly consolidated and issued a Tropical Cyclone Formation Alert on the developing system. Later that day, RSMC Nadi reported that the disturbance had organised enough to be classified as Tropical Depression 12F. Early the next morning, as the depression was moving towards the southeast, RSMC Nadi reported that outflow was good to the south of the depression and upgraded it to a Category 1 Cyclone, assigning the name Ken to the cyclone. Later that day, the JTWC started to issue advisories on the storm and designated it as Tropical Cyclone 21P.

Late on March 18, RSMC Nadi reported that Ken had reached its peak intensity with winds of 95 km/h (59 mph), which made it a Category 2 Cyclone. RSMC Nadi then passed primary warning responsibility of Cyclone Ken to TCWC Wellington who, downgraded Ken to a Category 1 Cyclone early the next day. Ken then re-intensified into a Category 2 Cyclone later that day; however it was quickly downgraded to a Category 1 Cyclone within their next advisory and then was declared extratropical by both TCWC Wellington and the JTWC early on March 20. As an extratropical cyclone, Ken reached 1-minute windspeeds of 110 km/h (70 mph). TCWC Wellington then issued their final advisory early on March 22, as it moved out of their eastern area of responsibility and was tracked by the Bureau of Meteorology for three more days as it crossed the Antarctic Peninsula into the Weddell Sea.

=== Tropical Cyclone Jasper ===
- Category 2 tropical cyclone (Australian scale)
- Tropical storm (SSHWS)
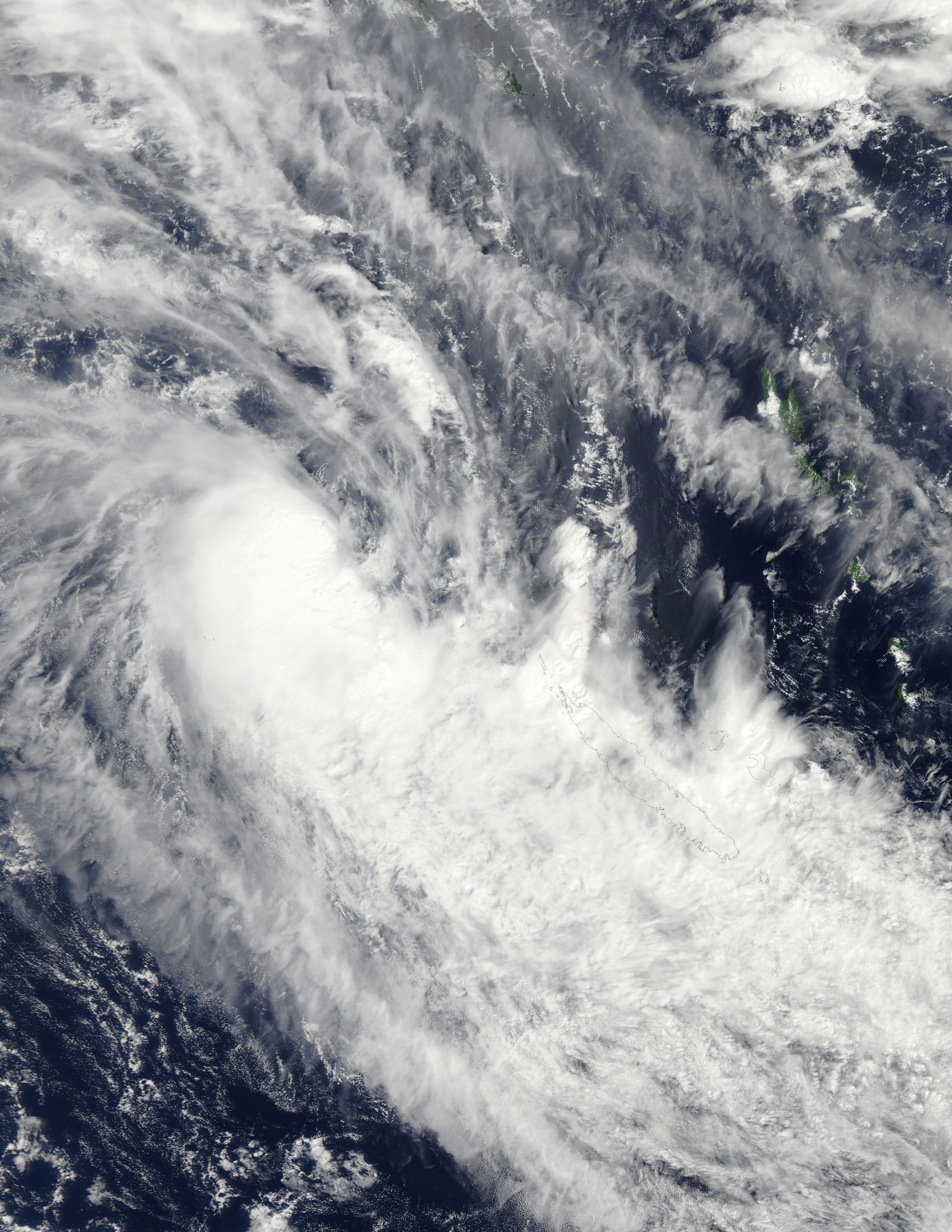
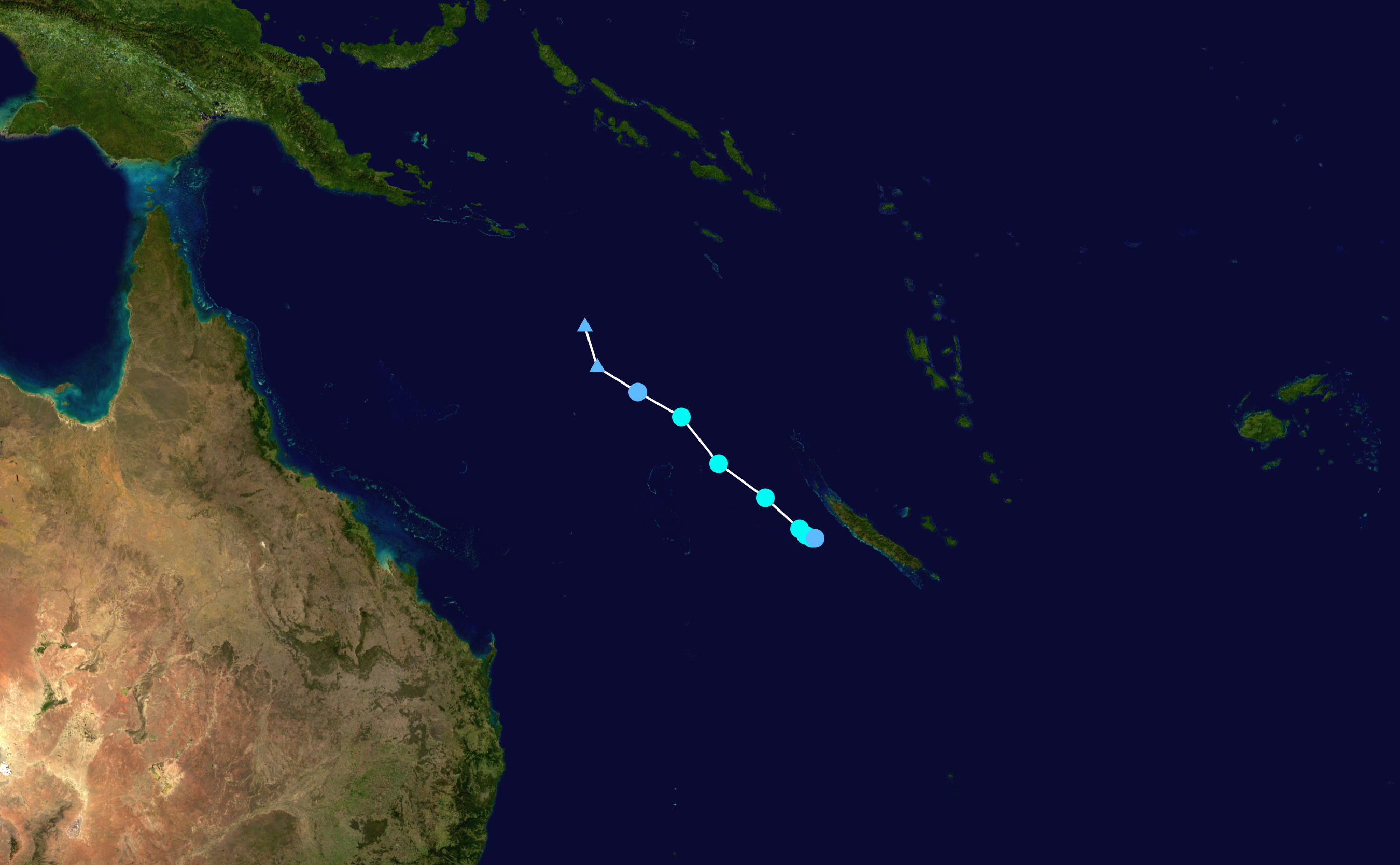
- Duration: March 24 – March 25
- Peak intensity: 95 km/h (60 mph) (10-min); 980 hPa (mbar)

During March 24, Cyclone Jasper moved into the South Pacific from the Australian region, while it at its peak intensity as a category 2 tropical cyclone with 10-minute sustained windspeeds of 95 km/h (60 mph). At this time, convection erupted about the centre and well-corroborated by the corresponding microwave data which showed good and intense low-level circulation. Outflow over the system was good to the south but inhibited elsewhere. However, overnight, convection warmed considerably with shear tearing the cold tops to the south of the low-level centre. Later on the 25th, increasing shear and dry air entrainment caused its demise and was subsequently downgraded to a depression at 251200 UTC.

Flooding, triggered by heavy rains in northern New Caledonia, forced the evacuation of 25 families. Rough seas produced by the storm caused beach erosion along the coastlines of New Caledonia. High winds caused localized structural damage and knocked down a few power lines, leaving some residents without power.

=== Tropical Cyclone Lin ===
- Category 2 tropical cyclone (Australian scale)
- Tropical storm (SSHWS)
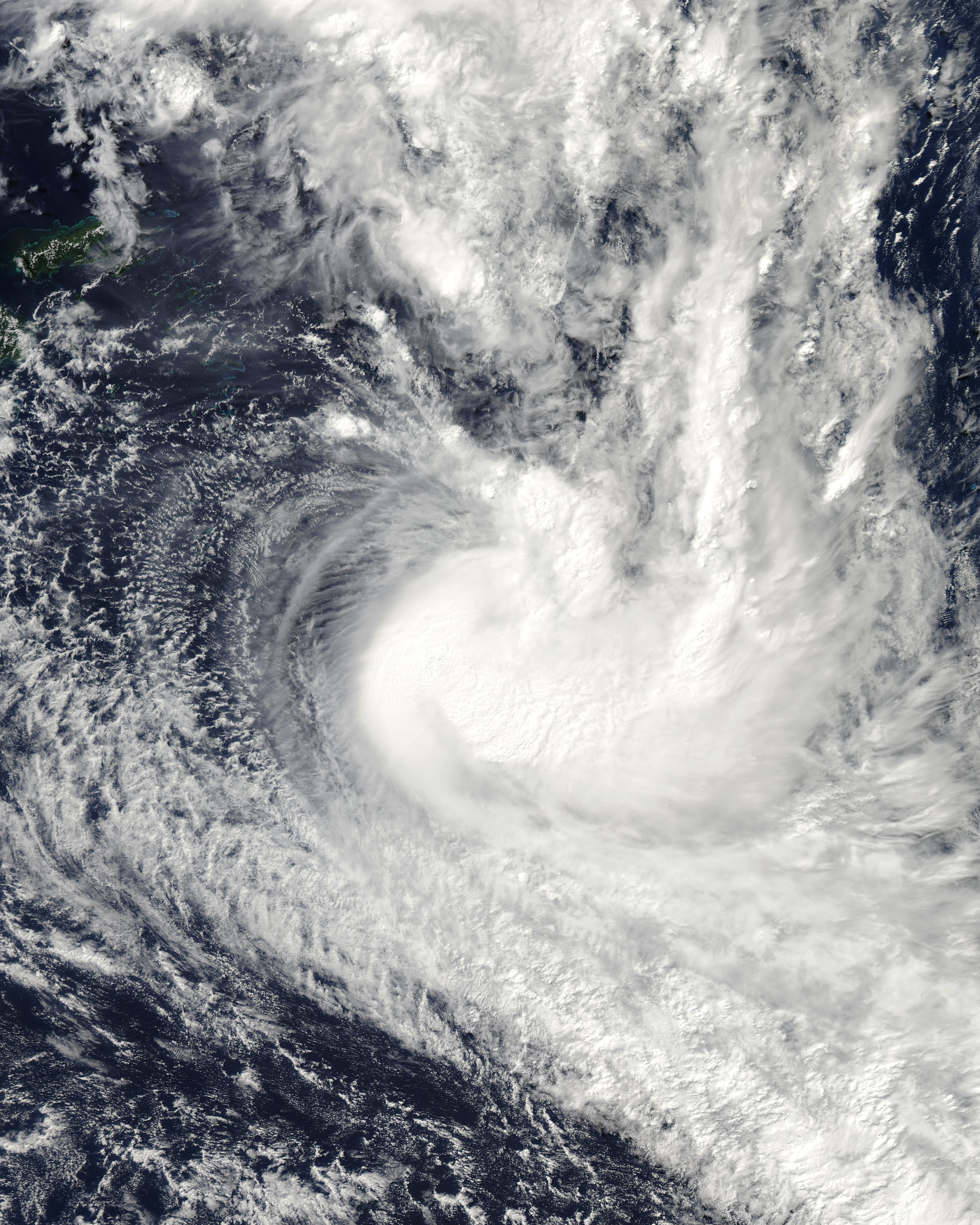
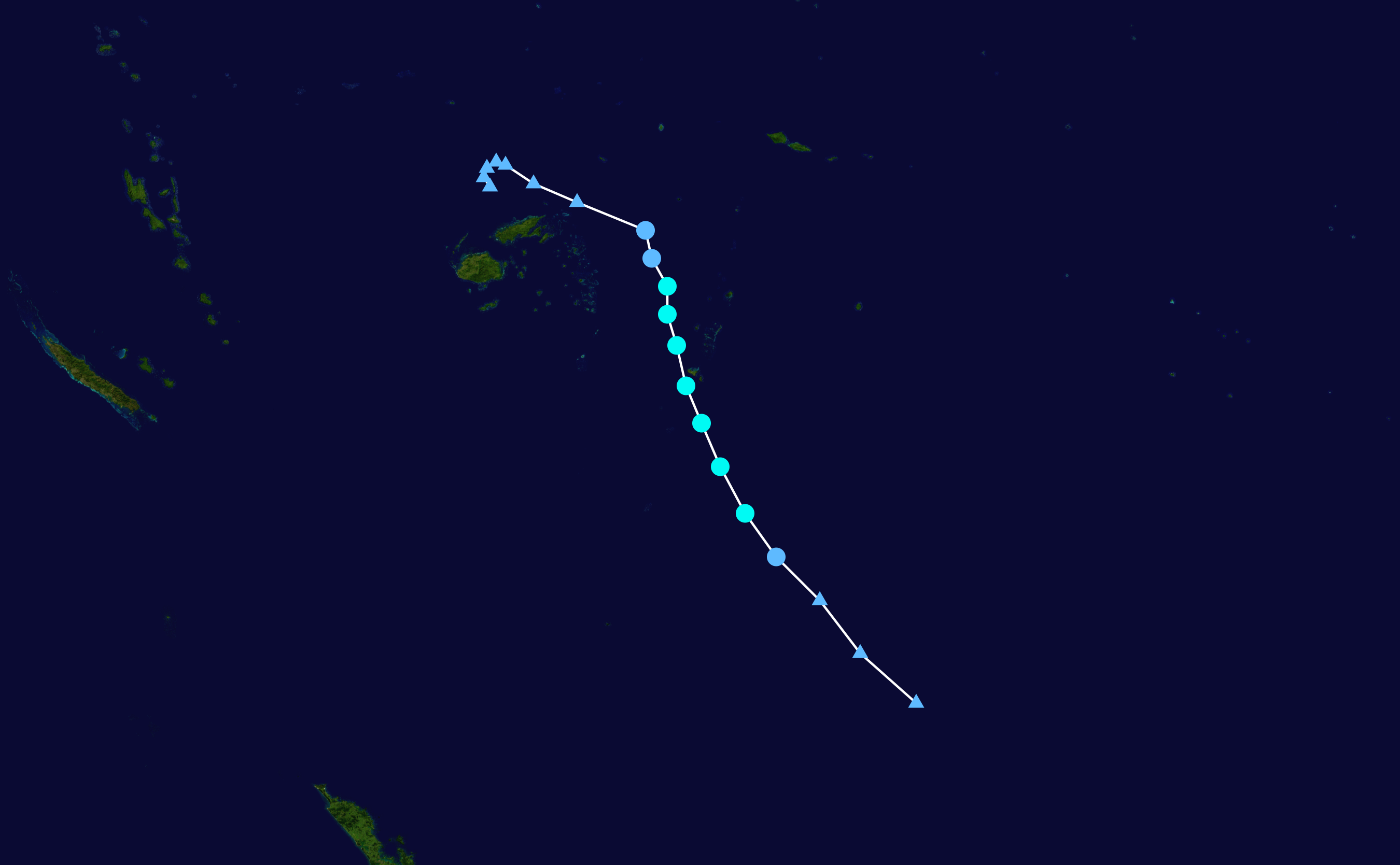
- Duration: April 1 – April 6
- Peak intensity: 110 km/h (70 mph) (10-min); 975 hPa (mbar)

During April 1, the FMS reported that Tropical Disturbance 14F had developed within a monsoon trough to the north of Fiji. During the following day, the system moved south-eastwards and developed into a tropical depression, while a shallow tropical disturbance developed within the monsoon trough to the south of Futuna. 14F subsequently absorbed this shallow tropical disturbance, as it struggled to consolidate and organise to the north of Fiji, under the influence of vertical wind shear. During April 3, the FMS reported that 14F had developed into a Category 1 tropical cyclone and named it Lin. The JTWC subsequently initiated advisories on Lin and designated it as Tropical Cyclone 25P, while it was located about 382 km (235 mi) to the northwest of Nuku'alofa. This was after atmospheric convection had developed over the systems low-level circulation centre and rapidly consolidated within favourable conditions. During April 4, Lin intensified further within favourable conditions and was classified as a Category 2 tropical cyclone, as it moved southeastwards towards the Tongan island of Tongatapu.

During the next day, after Lin had passed directly over Tongatapu, the FMS reported that the system had peaked with estimated 10-minute sustained wind speeds of 110 km/h (70 mph), while the JTWC estimated 1-minute sustained wind speeds of 100 km/h (60 mph). During that day the cyclone weakened and started to transition into an extratropical cyclone, as it interacted with drier air and vertical wind shear surrounding the system increased. This prompted the JTWC to issue their final warning on the system, before MetService declared it extratropical, as they took over the primary warning responsibility of Lin from the FMS. MetService continued to track Lin's extratropical remnants for a couple of days, before they were last noted near 35°S 163°W during April 8. There was no major damage reported within Fiji from Lin, while it brought storm-force winds, heavy rain and flooding to parts of Tonga. Within Tonga, there were no reports of any casualties or structural damage, however, it did cause some damage to root crops, fruit bearing trees, gardens and power lines. The Tonga Meteorological Service also sustained some damage to their guttering, as well as various pieces of meteorological equipment which was valued about T$ 2,000 (US$1000).

=== Other systems ===
On December 1, the FMS reported that the first tropical disturbance of the season, had developed to the northeast of the Samoan Islands in an area of moderate vertical wind shear. The system subsequently moved westwards, before it was last noted during the next day. Tropical Disturbance 02F subsequently developed during December 3, to the northeast of Rarotonga in the Southern Cook Islands. Over the next couple of days the system moved towards the south-west, between Niue and the Southern Cook Islands and was classified as a tropical depression during December 4.

The system was last noted during December 6, as it moved into TCWC Wellington's area of responsibility and transitioned into a mid latitude low-pressure system within 12 hours.

During December 10, the FMS reported that Tropical Disturbance 03F had developed about 300 km (185 mi) to the northeast of Honiara in the Solomon Islands. However, the system had no definite low level circulation center, while atmospheric convection surrounding the system was confined to the north quadrant of the disturbance. As a result, the system was last noted during the next day, with the FMS speculating that a cyclonic circulation to the northwest of 03F might have absorbed the disturbance.

Tropical Disturbance 15F was first noted within a monsoon trough by the FMS on April 7, while it was thought to be located to the northeast of the Solomon Islands. Atmospheric convection surrounding the disturbance was poorly organised, while it was reported to be hard to find the system's low-level circulation. Over the next few days, the system moved south-westwards and remained poorly organised, before it was last noted by the FMS during April 10.

== Season effects ==
This table lists all the storms that developed in the South Pacific to the east of longitude 160°E during the 2008–2009 season. It includes their intensity on the Australian Tropical cyclone intensity scale, duration, name, landfalls, deaths, and damages. All data is taken from RSMC Nadi and or TCWC Wellington. The damage figures are all 2009 USD.

Name	Dates	Peak intensity			Areas affected	Damage (USD)	Deaths	Ref(s).
Name	Dates	Category	Wind speed	Pressure	Areas affected	Damage (USD)	Deaths	Ref(s).
01F	December 1–2	Tropical disturbance	Not specified	1006 hPa (29.71 inHg)	None	None	None	
02F	December 3–7	Tropical depression	Not specified	1004 hPa (29.65 inHg)	Southern Cook Islands	None	None	
03F	December 10	Tropical depression	Not specified	1001 hPa (29.56 inHg)	None	None	None	
04F	January 4–14	Tropical depression	Not specified	1001 hPa (29.56 inHg)	Vanuatu, Fiji	$64.2 million	12	
05F	January 11–14	Tropical depression	Not specified	999 hPa (29.50 inHg)	Vanuatu, Fiji	$64.2 million	12	
06F	January 19–23	Tropical depression	Not specified	1005 hPa (29.68 inHg)	None	None	None	
07F	January 23–25	Tropical depression	Not specified	1006 hPa (29.71 inHg)	None	None	None	
Hettie	January 24–31	Category 1 tropical cyclone	65 km/h (40 mph)	995 hPa (29.38 inHg)	None	None	None	
09F	February 1–5	Tropical depression	55 km/h (35 mph)	998 hPa (29.47 inHg)	New Caledonia	Unknown	Unknown	
Innis	February 13–18	Category 1 tropical cyclone	75 km/h (45 mph)	990 hPa (29.23 inHg)	Vanuatu, New Caledonia	Minimal	1	
Joni	March 10–14	Category 2 tropical cyclone	95 km/h (60 mph)	980 hPa (28.94 inHg)	Cook Islands	Minor	Unknown	
Ken	March 16–19	Category 2 tropical cyclone	95 km/h (60 mph)	985 hPa (29.09 inHg)		Unknown	None	
Jasper	March 24–30	Category 2 tropical cyclone	100 km/h (60 mph)	980 hPa (28.94 inHg)	New Caledonia	Minimal	None	
Lin	March 31 – April 7	Category 2 tropical cyclone	110 km/h (70 mph)	975 hPa (28.79 inHg)	Fiji, Tonga	$920	None	
15F	April 7–10	Tropical disturbance	35 km/h (20 mph)	1004 hPa (29.65 inHg)	None	None	None	
Season aggregates
15 systems	December 1 – April 10		110 km/h (70 mph)	975 hPa (28.79 inHg)		$64.2 million	13	

== See also ==
- List of Southern Hemisphere tropical cyclone seasons
- Atlantic hurricane seasons: 2008, 2009
- Pacific hurricane seasons: 2008, 2009
- Pacific typhoon seasons: 2008, 2009
- North Indian Ocean cyclone seasons: 2008, 2009
