= January 2009 Fiji floods =

Natural disaster in Fiji

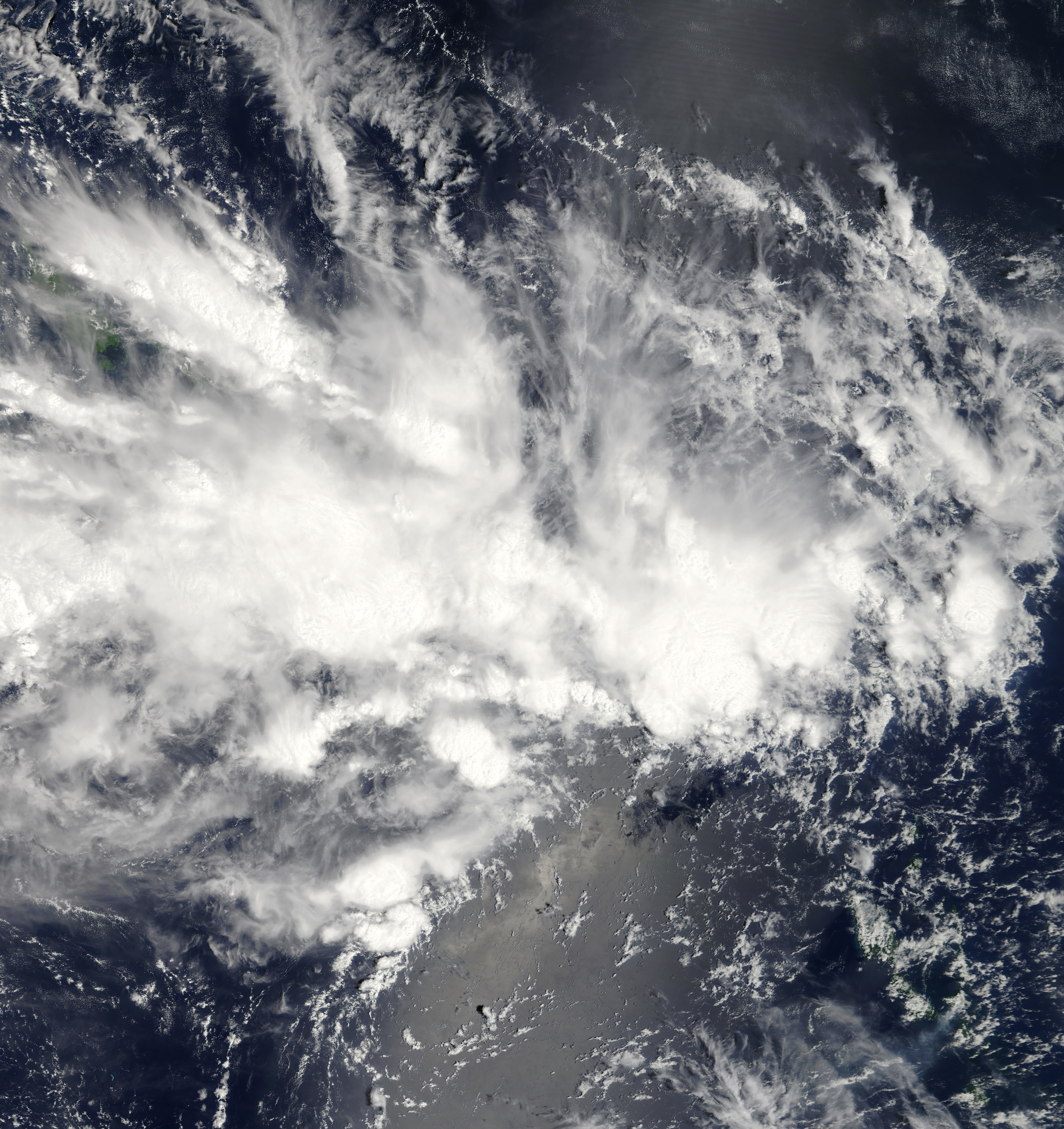
- Tropical Depression 04F on 4 January 2009
- Date: January 2009
- Location: Fiji
- Cause: The South Pacific Convergence Zone; A monsoon trough; Tropical Depression 04F; Tropical Depression 05F; Tropical Cyclone Hettie.
- Deaths: 11
- Property damage: 64.2

During January 2009, Fiji was impacted by a series of consecutive weather events, that caused severe flooding in various parts of the island nation. The floods were caused by a number of intense synoptic-scale weather features, which included an active monsoonal trough, the South Pacific Convergence Zone, Tropical Depression's 04F and 05F as well as Tropical Cyclone Hettie. These weather features combined to cause strong winds, considerable rainfall, as well as severe flooding across the island nation throughout the month.

== Meteorological synopsis ==
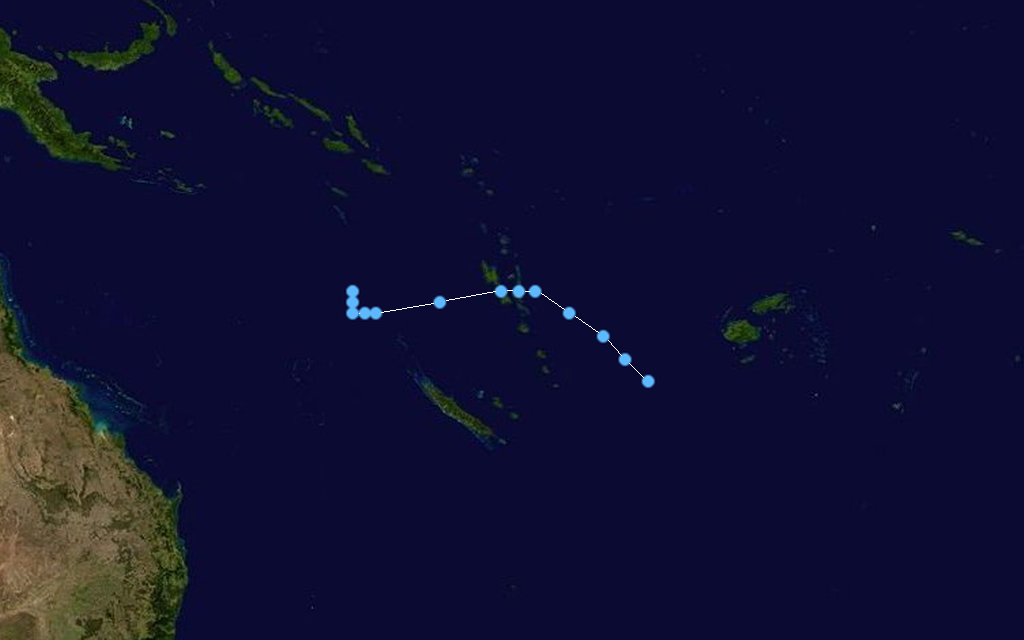
Map plotting the storm's track and intensity, according to the Saffir–Simpson scale Map key Saffir–Simpson scale Tropical depression (≤38 mph, ≤62 km/h) Tropical storm (39–73 mph, 63–118 km/h) Category 1 (74–95 mph, 119–153 km/h) Category 2 (96–110 mph, 154–177 km/h) Category 3 (111–129 mph, 178–208 km/h) Category 4 (130–156 mph, 209–251 km/h) Category 5 (≥157 mph, ≥252 km/h) Unknown Storm type Tropical cyclone Subtropical cyclone Extratropical cyclone, remnant low, tropical disturbance, or monsoon depression

During January 2009, Fiji was impacted by a series of consecutive weather events, that caused severe flooding in various parts of the island nation. These events included: an active monsoonal trough, an enhanced South Pacific Convergence Zone, Tropical Depression's 04F and 05F as well as Tropical Cyclone Hettie. These weather features combined caused strong winds, considerable rainfall, as well as, severe flooding across the island nation throughout the month.

During 6 January, the SPCZ combined with a vigorous monsoon trough moved over Fiji, where it produced intense and persistent rain as well as strong winds over the islands. Tropical Depression 04F subsequently brushed past the island nation between 6 and 9 January, after it had been first noted to the west of Vanuatu during 5 January. As the monsoon trough moved northwards during 11 January, there was a brief respite from the weather over most of the islands, however, the weather deteriorated as the trough drifted southwards during 13 January. The SPCZ and the trough subsequently drifted northwards and hovered over northern Fiji during 15 January, as a ridge of high pressure moved in from the south.

Several tropical disturbances subsequently developed and moved eastwards along the monsoon trough, however, none of these was as significant as Tropical Cyclone Hettie's precursor tropical disturbance. Hettie extended a trough of low pressure over the islands, which caused heavy rain and strong southerly winds over Fiji's Southern, Central and Eastern Divisions. As a result of this, severe flooding was reported over the interior and eastern parts of Viti Levu, during 28 and 29 January, with rainfall totals of over 100 mm (3.937 in) recorded at Vatukoula, Nacocolevu, Koronivia, Nausori Airport and Tokotoko-Navua.

== Preparations and impact ==
The 2009 Fiji floods occurred on 10 January 2009, and the following days after Tropical Depression 04F hit the western section of the island of Viti Levu in Fiji. This area is ordinarily the "dry" side of the island. The floods left eleven people dead, including three teenagers, with six drowning in the flood waters, and a landslide killing another two. In some areas, flood waters reached heights of up to 3 meters.

Tropical Depression 04F brought heavy rainfall to the Northern, Central and Western divisions of Fiji from 8 January until 10 January. There was a total of eleven people killed within Fiji whilst over 6,000 people were displaced and went to 114 emergency shelters, and were given "meals...biscuits, milk and other dry stock." In addition, power and telephone lines have been downed, and many roads were rendered impassable. Sugarcane, an important crop in the affected region, was heavily destroyed. Frank Bainimarama, the interim Prime Minister, declared a state of emergency, and said that the government is working diligently to assist in relief efforts. Because of the state of emergency, there are mandatory curfews in several large towns to prevent looting. The damage was estimated at 112.99 million FJD (US$64.2 million).

At least 600 tourists, mostly from New Zealand, were left stranded by the flooding.

== Aftermath and response ==
Australia donated approximately AU$3 million (US$2.12 million) to the Relief fund. This was made up of AU$1 million (US$707,000) for immediate assistance and AU$2 million (US$1.41 million) for long-term assistance. AusAID also donated just under 390,000 FJD (US$222,000) to assist with the repairs to school infrastructure and the provision of resources to flood-affected schools. New Zealand also donated near NZ$4 million (US$2.35 million) to the relief fund. This was made up of NZ$3 million (US$1.76 million) for long term recovery and NZ$80,000 (US$47,000) for the educational needs of people in the areas that were hardest hit by the depression. The European Union also donated over $2 million FJD (US$1.14 million), which was also for rehabilitation of schools as well as paying of some of the fees that students are required to pay. The Governments of the United Kingdom, China, France, Tonga, Korea and Samoa each contributed money to the relief fund totaling up to 286,000 FJD (US$162,000). Whilst the governments of Papua New Guinea, New Caledonia, and India pledged over US$700,000 to the relief effort and for reconstruction efforts. The US Embassy and the China Red Cross also donated just under 120,000FJD worth of goods for relief efforts.

== See also ==
- 2008-09 South Pacific cyclone season
- Timeline of the 2008–09 South Pacific cyclone season
