= Rashmi =

Name list

Rashmi, Rashami, Rasmi
- Gender: Female, Male
- Language: Sanskrit; Kannada; Hindi

Origin
- Meaning: "First Ray of Light"
- Region of origin: India, Nepal

Other names
- Related names: Rasmih, Reshmi

Rashmi (also Rashami, Rashmika) (Sanskrit: रश्मि) is a Hindu, Sanskrit unisexual name in India. Rashmi means a single 'First ray of light', a very popular name in Hindu. More common in females as compared to males.

== Notable people named Rashmi ==
- Rashami Desai (born August 4, 1986), Indian actress, model and dancer
- Rashmi, Indian Actress
- Rashmi Bansal, Indian writer, entrepreneur, and a youth expert
- Rashmi C. Desai, Indian-American physicist
- Rashmi Doraiswamy, Indian film critic
- Rashmi Gautam, Indian television presenter and film actress
- Rashmi Kumari, Indian carrom champion
- Rashmi Nigam, Indian model and actress
- Rashmi Parida (born July 7, 1977), Indian cricketer
- Rashmi R. Rao, Indian radio personality and actor
- Rashmi Singh, an Indian lyricist
- Rashmi Sinha, Indian businesswoman
- Rashmi Sinha, nutritional and cancer epidemiologist
- Rashmi Tiwari, Indian human-rights activist
- Rashmi Uday Singh (29 January 1955), Indian food expert
- Rashmi Verma, Indian politician
- Rashmika Mandanna, Indian film actress and model
- Rashmi Kandel - Mad Honey Exporter from Nepal

== Others ==
- Rashmirathi, Ramdhari Singh's 1952 Hindi epic book
- Cyclone Rashmi, seventh tropical cyclone of the 2008 North Indian Ocean cyclone season
