= Amanda Cross (disambiguation) =

Amanda Cross is the pen-name of mystery novel writer Carolyn Gold Heilbrun.

Amanda Cross may also refer to:

- Amanda Cross (rower), Australian rower
- Amanda Cross (scientist), British epidemiologist
