= Cyclone Nisha (2008) =

Tropical cyclone in the Indian Ocean

Cyclonic Storm Nisha
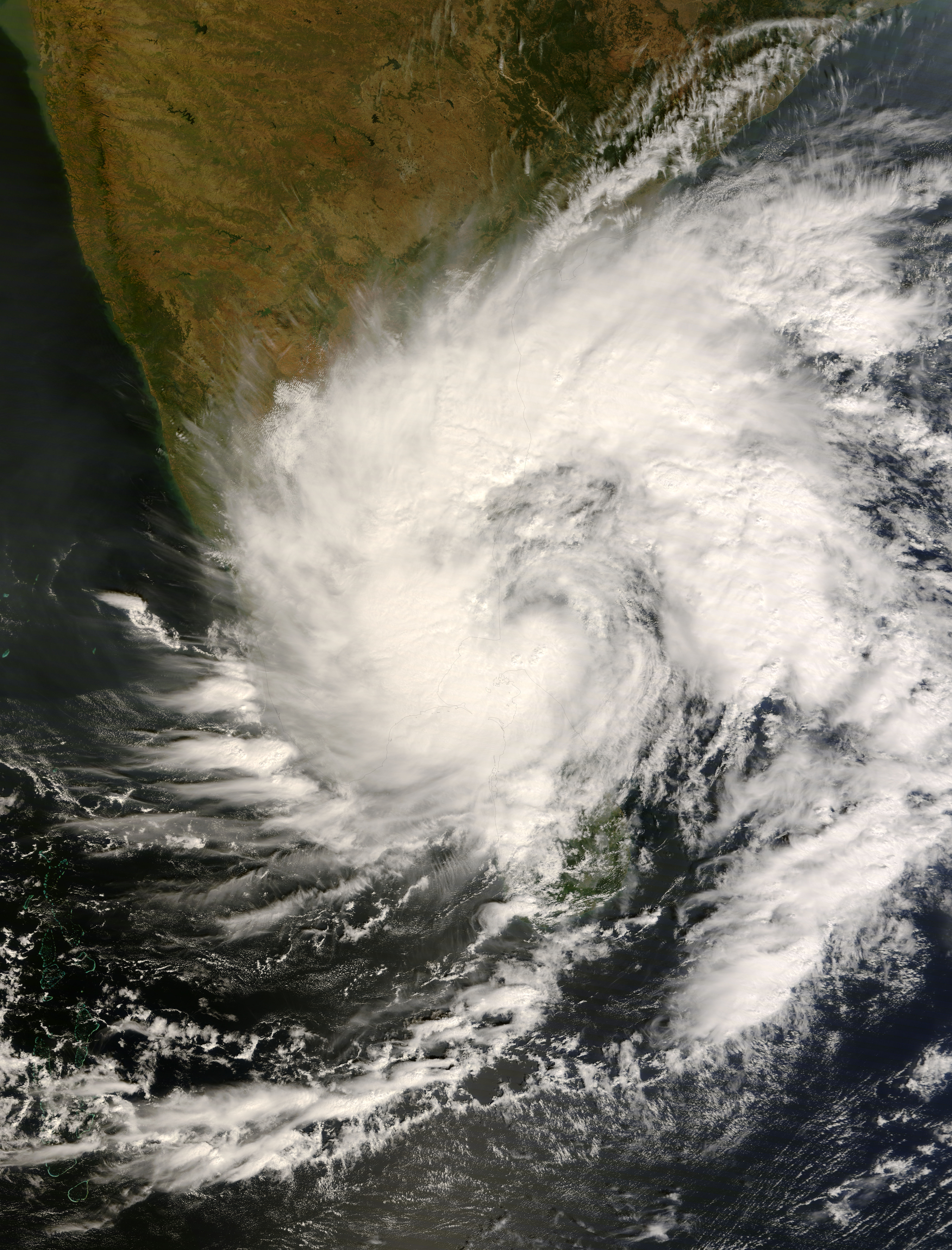
- Tropical Cyclone Nisha off the Tamil Nadu coast on 26 November

Meteorological history
- Formed: 25 November 2008
- Dissipated: 29 November 2008

Cyclonic storm
- 3-minute sustained (IMD)
- Highest winds: 85 km/h (50 mph)
- Lowest pressure: 996 hPa (mbar); 29.41 inHg

Tropical storm
- 1-minute sustained (SSHWS/JTWC)
- Highest winds: 100 km/h (65 mph)
- Lowest pressure: 985 hPa (mbar); 29.09 inHg

Overall effects
- Fatalities: 204
- Damage: $800 million (2008 USD)
- Areas affected: Sri Lanka, India
- IBTrACS
- Part of the 2008 North Indian Ocean cyclone season

Cyclonic Storm Nisha (Note: The name Nisha (Bengali: নিশা; [ˈniʃaˑ]) was contributed by Bangladesh and means night in Bengali.) (IMD designation: BOB 07, JTWC designation: 06B) was a fairly weak but catastrophic tropical cyclone that struck Sri Lanka, and India, killing over 200 people. It was the ninth tropical cyclone of the 2008 North Indian Ocean cyclone season, and the seventh tropical cyclone in the Bay of Bengal that year.

== Meteorological history ==
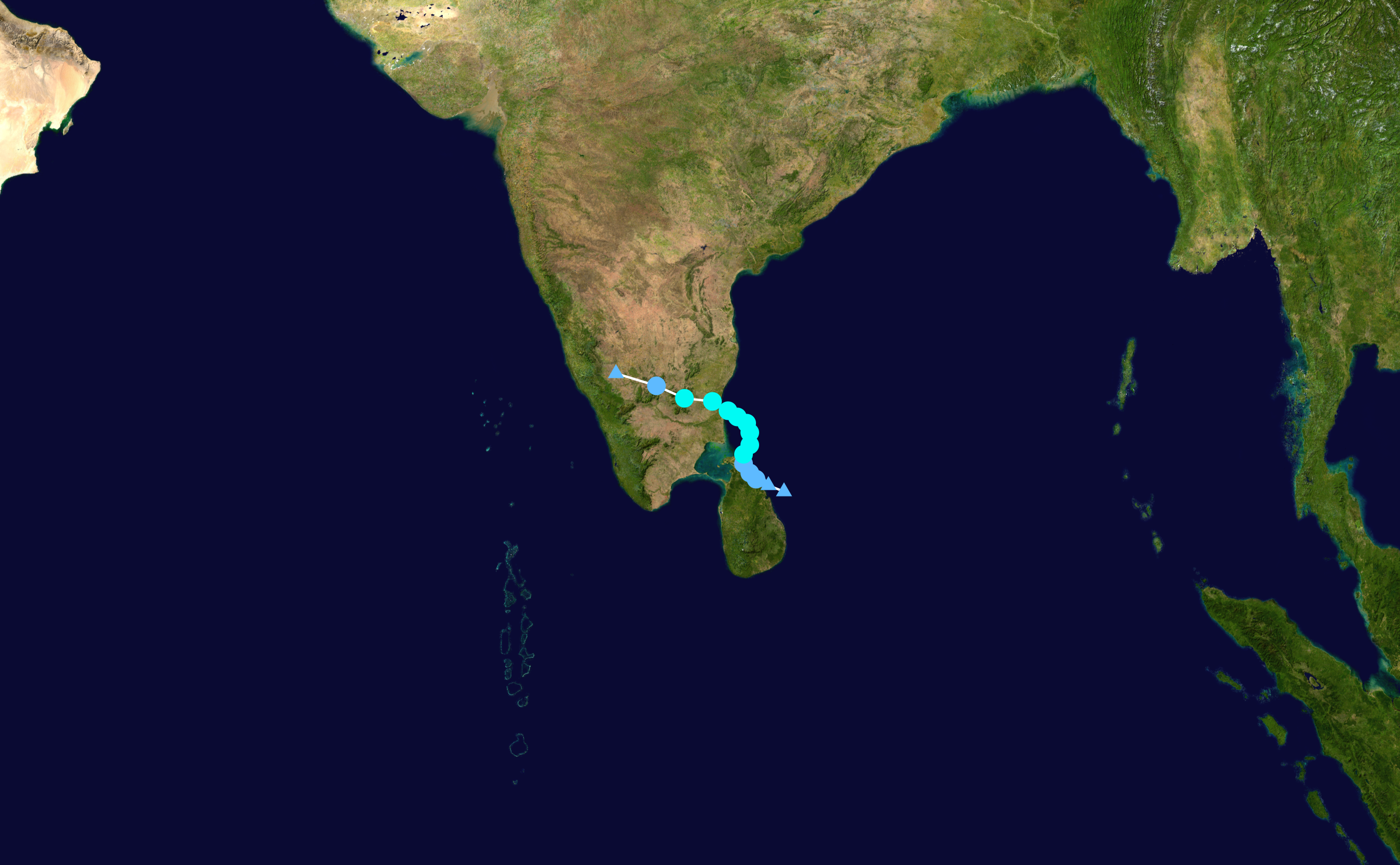
Map plotting the storm's track and intensity, according to the Saffir–Simpson scale Map key Saffir–Simpson scale Tropical depression (≤38 mph, ≤62 km/h) Tropical storm (39–73 mph, 63–118 km/h) Category 1 (74–95 mph, 119–153 km/h) Category 2 (96–110 mph, 154–177 km/h) Category 3 (111–129 mph, 178–208 km/h) Category 4 (130–156 mph, 209–251 km/h) Category 5 (≥157 mph, ≥252 km/h) Unknown Storm type Tropical cyclone Subtropical cyclone Extratropical cyclone, remnant low, tropical disturbance, or monsoon depression

On 24 November an area of low pressure formed over land in Sri Lanka. Later that day the Joint Typhoon Warning Center assessed the low-pressure area's chance of becoming a significant tropical cyclone within 24 hours as 'poor', due to the minimal convection near the low-level circulation center. The next morning the JTWC issued a Tropical Cyclone Formation Alert on the low-pressure area, stating it had a 'good' chance of becoming a significant tropical cyclone within 24 hours, as the Low Level Circulation Center was moving into the Bay of Bengal. Two hours later the IMD upgraded the area of low pressure to Depression BOB 07. Three hours later the India Meteorological Department reported that the depression had intensified into a Deep Depression whilst remaining stationary. Later that day the JTWC upgraded the Deep Depression to Tropical Cyclone 06B and reported that the depression had wind speeds equivalent to a tropical storm, on the Saffir–Simpson hurricane scale.

Early on 26 November, the India Meteorological Department upgraded the deep depression to a Cyclonic Storm and named it Nisha. Later that day as Nisha moved northwest towards India, both the JTWC and the IMD reported that Nisha had reached its peak wind speeds of 55 kts (63 mph 102 km/h 1-min) 45 knots (52 mph 83 km/h 3-min). Early the next day the IMD reported that Cyclonic Storm Nisha had made landfall in Tamil Nadu, India, at 0030 UTC. Later that day as the IMD reported that Nisha had weakened into a deep depression, The JTWC issued their final advisory on Nisha. The IMD then reported that Nisha had weakened into a Depression and then issued their last advisory the next day, reporting that Nisha had weakened into a well-marked area of low pressure.

== Preparations and impact ==
Death toll
Sri Lanka	15
Tamil Nadu, India	189
Total	204

=== Sri Lanka ===
Fifteen people were killed when Nisha hit northern Sri Lanka on 25 November 2008, causing heavy rains and flooding that reportedly displaced between 60,000 and 70,000 people in Vanni and 20,000 people in Jaffna district. Jaffna recorded the highest rainfall since 1918, of 520.1 mm of rain in one week, with the 26 November total rainfall (389.8 mm) being the highest in nine decades.

=== India ===
At least 189 people were killed by the heavy rains and floods caused by the Nisha in Tamil Nadu. Some places have recorded extreme rainfall, notably Orathanadu, Thanjavur District where over 660 mm of rain fell in a 24-hour period, breaking the 65-year-old record of highest daily rainfall in Tamil Nadu. In two days, Orathanadu registered 990 mm of rainfall. Previously the highest amount of rainfall in a day was 570 mm registered by Cuddalore on 18 May 1943. During the four-day period from 25 through 28 November, Orathanadu received 1280 mm of rainfall, making it as the 4th wettest Cylone in India to date. A map showing the most affected areas was released by ReliefWeb. Damage in India totaled to 3789 crores, or 800 million in 2008 USD.

== See also ==
- 2008 North Indian Ocean cyclone season
- List of wettest tropical cyclones
