= Amanda Cross (scientist) =

British epidemiologist

Amanda Jane Cross
- Scientific career
- Institutions: University of Cambridge
- Thesis: Red meat and endogenous N-nitrosation as risk factors for colorectal cancer (2002)

Amanda J. Cross is a British epidemiologist who is a professor at Imperial College London. She is head of the Cancer Screening and Prevention Research Group and head of the Section of Gastrointestinal Surgery.

== Early life and education ==
As a child, Cross wanted to become a veterinary researcher. Cross became interested in cancer research during her undergraduate degree. Cross completed her doctoral research at the University of Cambridge, where she investigated the links between red meat and colorectal cancer. After earning her doctorate, Cross worked as a postdoctoral researcher at the National Cancer Institute. During her time in America she served as a mentor at Yale. In America, she worked on two colonoscopy screening studies, including the Polyp Prevention Trial and the CONCeRN study.

== Research and career ==
Cross joined Imperial College London in 2013. She has developed research programmes focused on gastrointestinal malignancies and etiologic studies of how lifestyle impacts cancer risk. She was made Head of the Cancer Screening and Prevention Research Group (CSPRG) group in 2018. Her research has contributed to international guidelines on colonoscopy, which to improve patient outcomes and ease the pressure on healthcare systems.

== Awards and honours ==
- NIH Fellows Award for Research Excellence
- Division of Cancer Epidemiology and Genetics Fellowship Achievement Award for Outstanding Accomplishments
- Division of Cancer Epidemiology and Genetics Award for Outstanding Research Paper by a Fellow
- NCI Mentor of Merit Award
- NIH Merit Award for Leadership of an Innovative Multidisciplinary Research Program

== Selected publications ==
- Amanda J Cross; Rashmi Sinha (1 January 2004). "Meat-related mutagens/carcinogens in the etiology of colorectal cancer". Environmental and Molecular Mutagenesis. 44 (1): 44–55. doi:10.1002/EM.20030. ISSN 0893-6692. PMID 15199546. Wikidata Q35806738.
- Rashmi Sinha; Amanda J Cross; Barry I Graubard; Michael F Leitzmann; Arthur Schatzkin (1 March 2009). "Meat intake and mortality: a prospective study of over half a million people". JAMA Internal Medicine. 169 (6): 562–571. doi:10.1001/ARCHINTERNMED.2009.6. ISSN 2168-6106. PMC 2803089. PMID 19307518. Wikidata Q33577215.
- Carrie R. Daniel; Amanda J. Cross; Corinna Koebnick; Rashmi Sinha (12 November 2010). "Trends in meat consumption in the USA" (PDF). Public Health Nutrition. 14 (4): 575–583. doi:10.1017/S1368980010002077. ISSN 1368-9800. PMC 3045642. PMID 21070685. Wikidata Q33744581.
