= 2008 North Indian Ocean cyclone season =

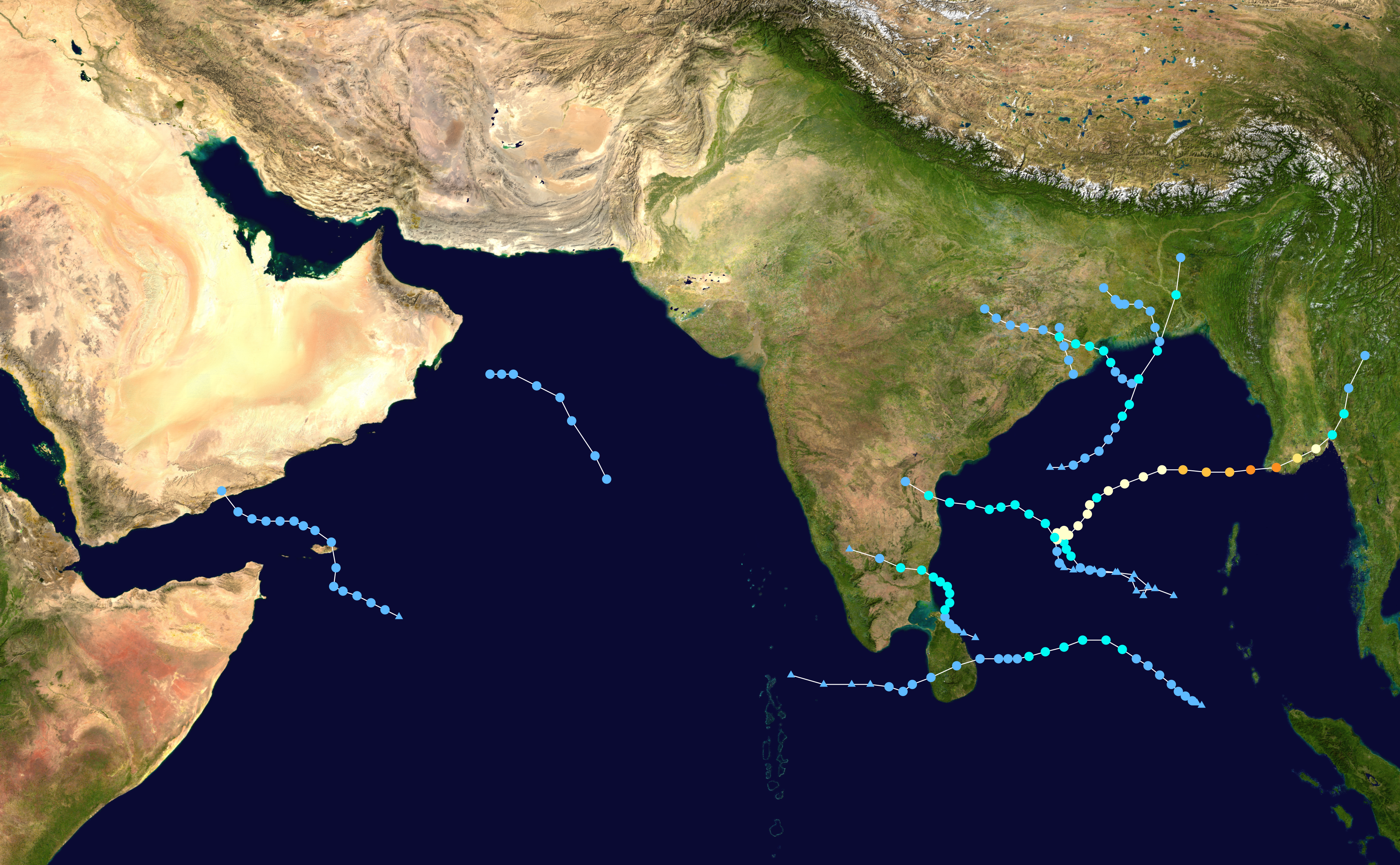
- Season summary map

Seasonal boundaries
- First system formed: April 27, 2008
- Last system dissipated: December 8, 2008

Strongest storm
- Name: Nargis
  - Maximum winds: 165 km/h (105 mph) (3-minute sustained)
  - Lowest pressure: 962 hPa (mbar)

Seasonal statistics
- Depressions: 10
- Deep depressions: 7
- Cyclonic storms: 4
- Severe cyclonic storms: 1
- Very severe cyclonic storms: 1
- Extremely severe cyclonic storms: 1
- Super cyclonic storms: 0
- Total fatalities: 138,927 total (Fifth-deadliest tropical cyclone season on record overall)
- Total damage: ~ $15.4 billion (2008 USD) (Third-costliest North Indian Ocean cyclone season on record)

Related articles
- Timeline of the 2008 North Indian Ocean cyclone season; 2008 Atlantic hurricane season; 2008 Pacific hurricane season; 2008 Pacific typhoon season

The 2008 North Indian cyclone season was one of the most destructive tropical cyclone seasons in modern history, causing more than 140,000 fatalities and over US$15 billion in damage. At the time, it was the costliest season in the North Indian Ocean, until it was surpassed by 2020. The North Indian Ocean cyclone season has no official bounds but cyclones tend to form between April and December. These dates conventionally delimit the period of each year when most tropical cyclones form in the northern Indian Ocean. There are two main seas in the North Indian Ocean—the Bay of Bengal, which is east of India, and the Arabian Sea, which is west of India. The official Regional Specialized Meteorological Centre in this basin is the India Meteorological Department (IMD), however the Joint Typhoon Warning Center releases unofficial advisories for military interests. An average of four to six storms form in the North Indian Ocean every season. Cyclones occurring between the meridians 45°E and 100°E are included in the season by the IMD.

During 2008, the IMD monitored a total of ten depressions across the North Indian Ocean, significantly below the average of fifteen. Of these systems, seven developed into deep depressions, four into cyclonic storms, and one into a very severe cyclonic storm. The JTWC unofficially tracked seven systems, with six having one-minute sustained winds greater than 65 km/h (40 mph), slightly above their 32-year average of five. Activity was mainly confined to the Bay of Bengal, with only two depressions developing in the Arabian Sea. Collectively, there were a total of 30 days of activity in the basin, with no storms existing simultaneously.

The first and most destructive storm of the season, Cyclone Nargis struck the Irrawaddy Delta in southern Myanmar, with a 3 to 5 m (9.8 to 16.4 ft) storm surge. Approximately 800,000 homes were severely damaged or destroyed and infrastructure was devastated. An estimated 138,373 people lost their lives and damage reached K13 trillion (US$15.6 billion). Nargis is regarded as the worst disaster in the nation's history as well as the fourth-deadliest tropical cyclone on record. Other storms throughout the season caused significant damage in Bangladesh, India, Sri Lanka, and Yemen. A depression in October was responsible for 180 deaths and US$1.638 billion in damage across Yemen. Overall, approximately 138,927 people were killed and losses totaled $15.4 billion (2008 USD).

== Systems ==
=== Extremely Severe Cyclonic Storm Nargis ===
- Extremely severe cyclonic storm (IMD)
- Category 4 tropical cyclone (SSHWS)
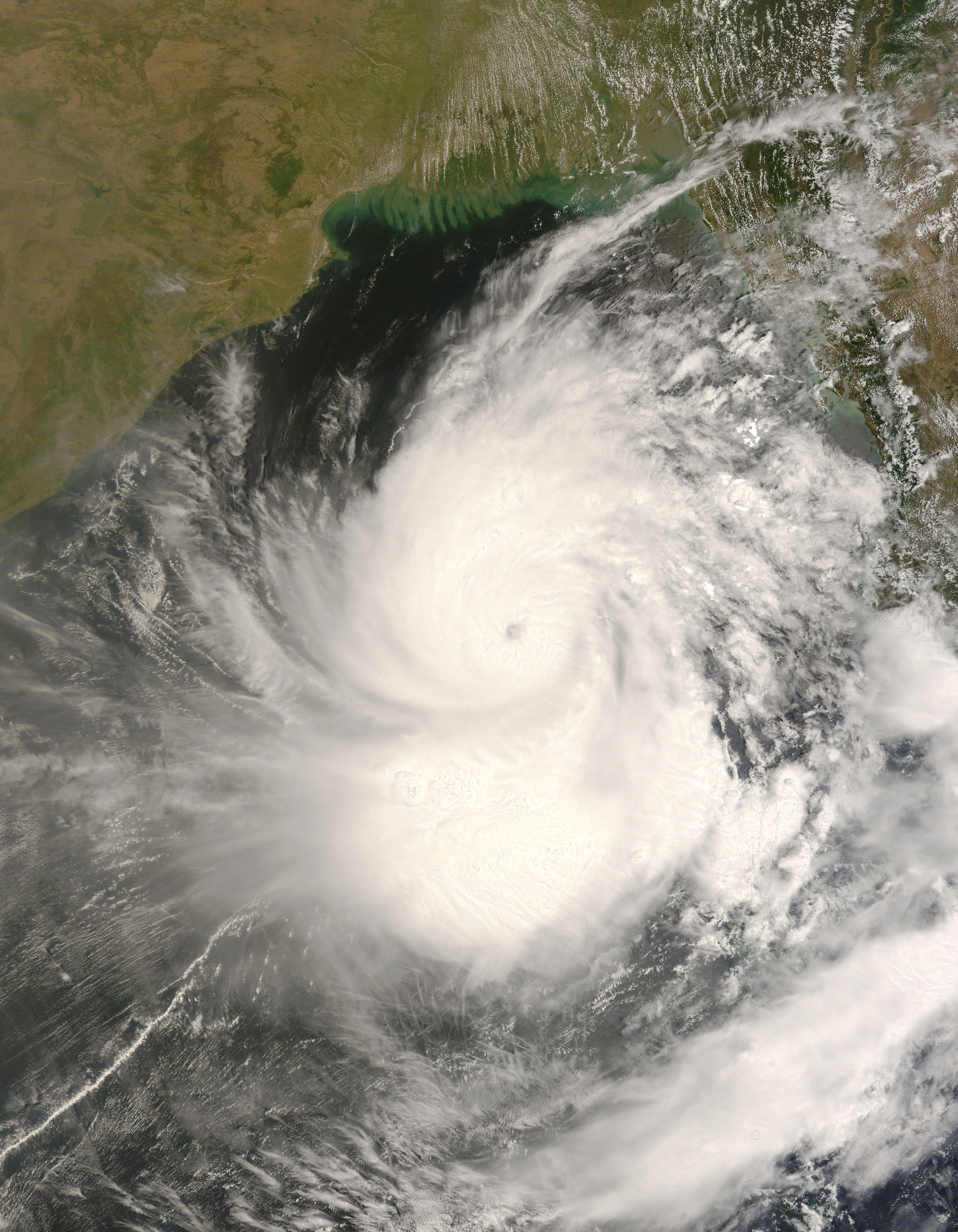
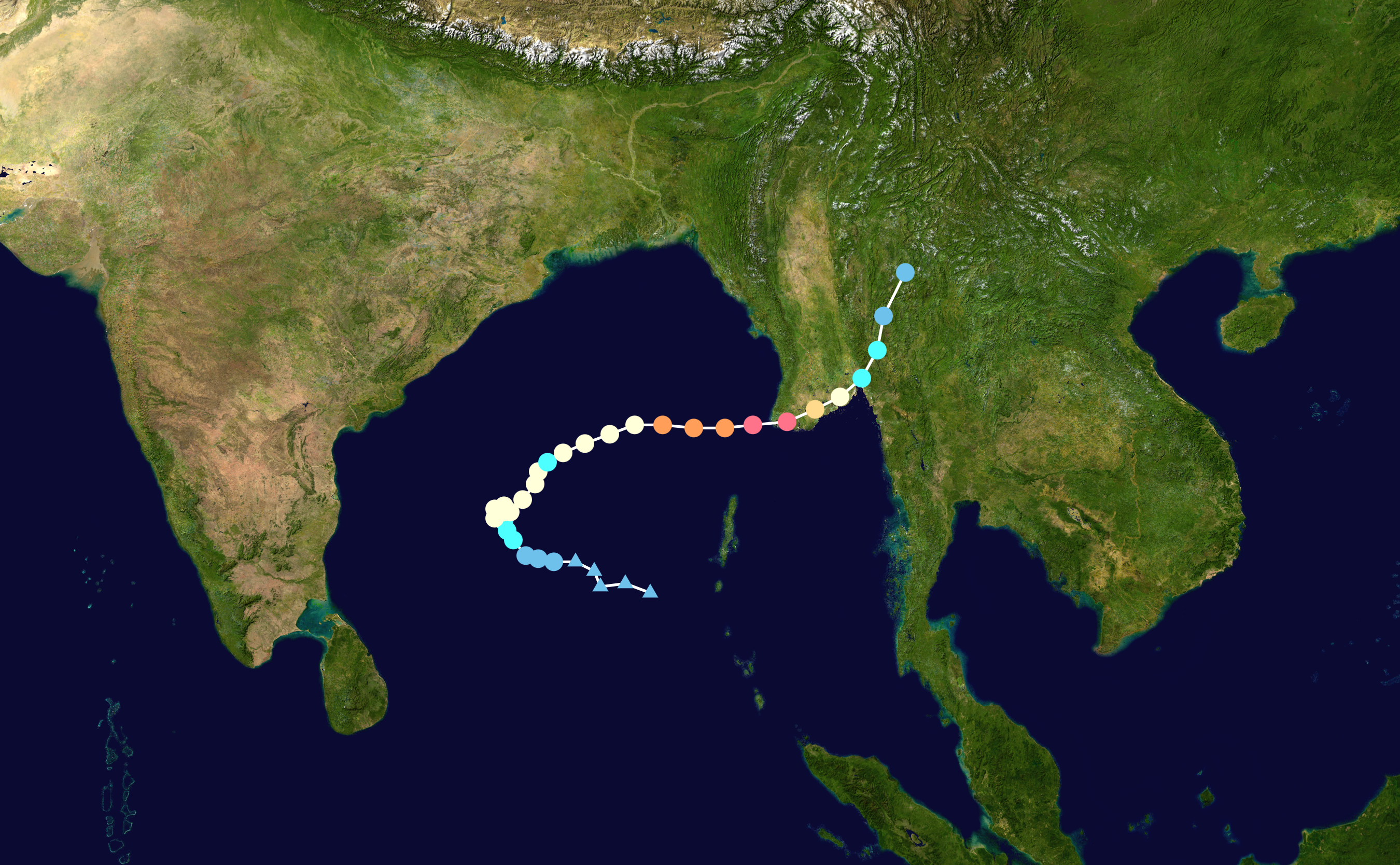
- Duration: April 27 – May 3
- Peak intensity: 165 km/h (105 mph) (3-min); 962 hPa (mbar)

In late April, the Intertropical Convergence Zone became very active over the Bay of Bengal and later spawned a low-pressure area on April 26. Being in an environment with low wind shear, favorable outflow, and high sea surface temperatures, the system would consolidate into a depression the following day. Tracking slowly westward, the depression intensified, becoming Cyclonic Storm Nargis on April 28. (Note: The name Nargis (Urdu: نرگس, [nəɾ.ɡɪs]) was contributed by Pakistan and means "narcissus" in Urdu.) That day, steering currents weakened, causing the system to become nearly stationary before a trough caused it to move northeasterly, and later easterly. Hours before striking southern Myanmar on May 2, Nargis would attain its peak intensity with winds of 165 km/h (105 mph) and an estimated central pressure of 962 mbar (hPa; 28.41 inHg). The JTWC estimated the system to be stronger, attaining one-minute sustained winds of 215 km/h (135 mph). Once inland, the system gradually weakened and dissipated early on May 4.

Striking the Irrawaddy Delta with unprecedented intensity, Nargis produced a devastating 3 to 5 m (9.8 to 16.4 ft) storm surge over the region and a maximum wind speed of 190 km/h was also reported. Approximately 23,500 km^{2} (9,100 sq mi) of land was inundated by the storm, affecting roughly 11 million people, 2.4 million severely. Infrastructural impacts were tremendous, with 450,000 homes, 4,000 schools, and 75 percent of healthcare facilities destroyed and 350,000 homes severely damaged. With approximately 140,000 fatalities taking place in Myanmar, Nargis is regarded as the worst disaster in the country's history and ranks as the fourth-deadliest tropical cyclone on record. Damage from the storm amounted to K13 trillion (US$15.3 billion), the majority of which occurred within the private sector.

In the immediate aftermath of the cyclone, numerous members of the international community were prepared to provide Myanmar with aid. For several weeks, the State Peace and Development Council (Myanmar's military junta) insisted that the nation could cope with the disaster and refused aid. This was soon determined to be ignorance of the situation and put millions of lives at risk. Some reports indicated that the army even obstructed private relief, setting up check-points, confiscating goods, and arresting those trying to help. In 2009, it was stated that the actions of the government could be condemned as crimes against humanity for "intentionally causing great suffering, or serious injury to body or to mental or physical health."

=== Depression ARB 01 ===
- Depression (IMD)
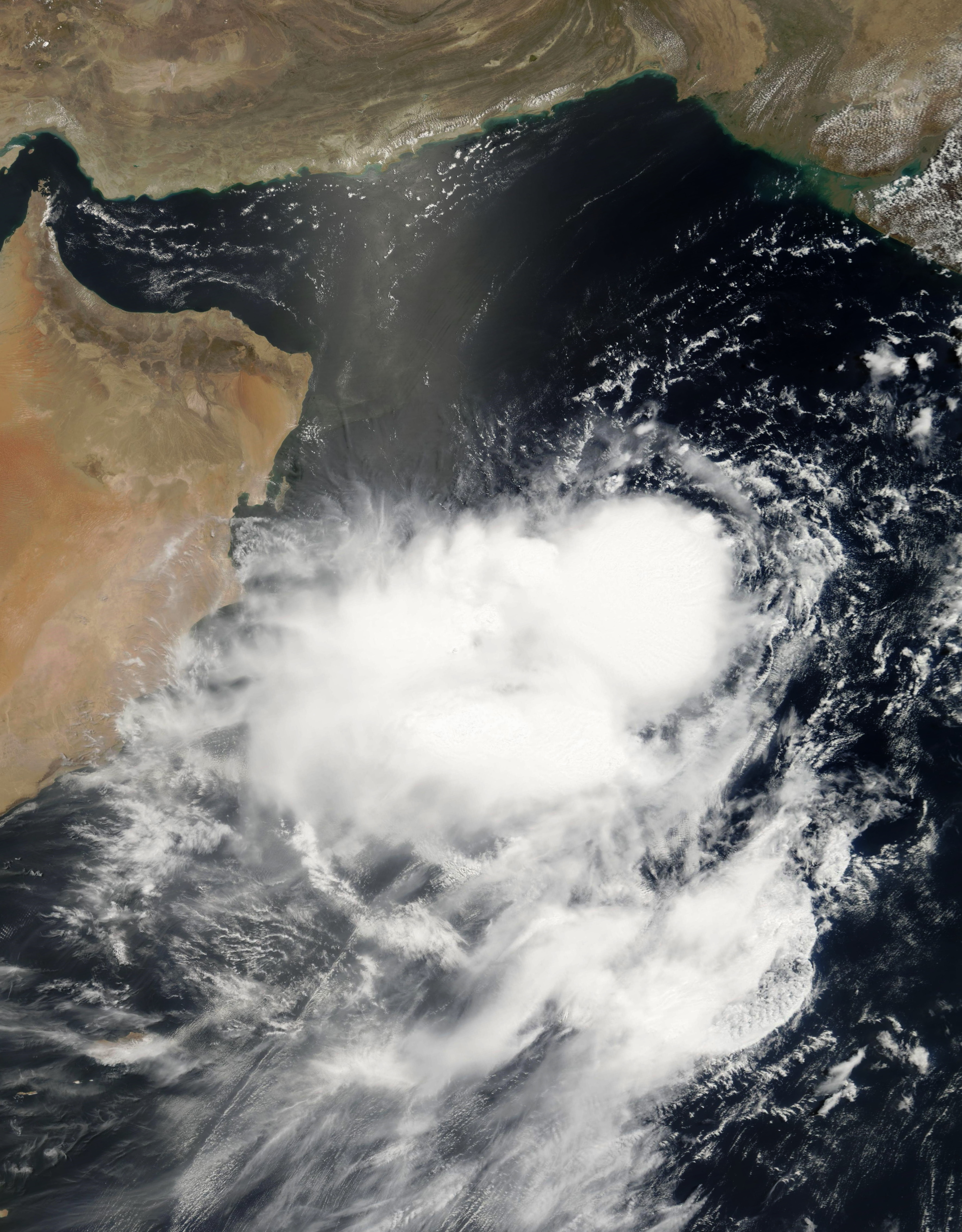
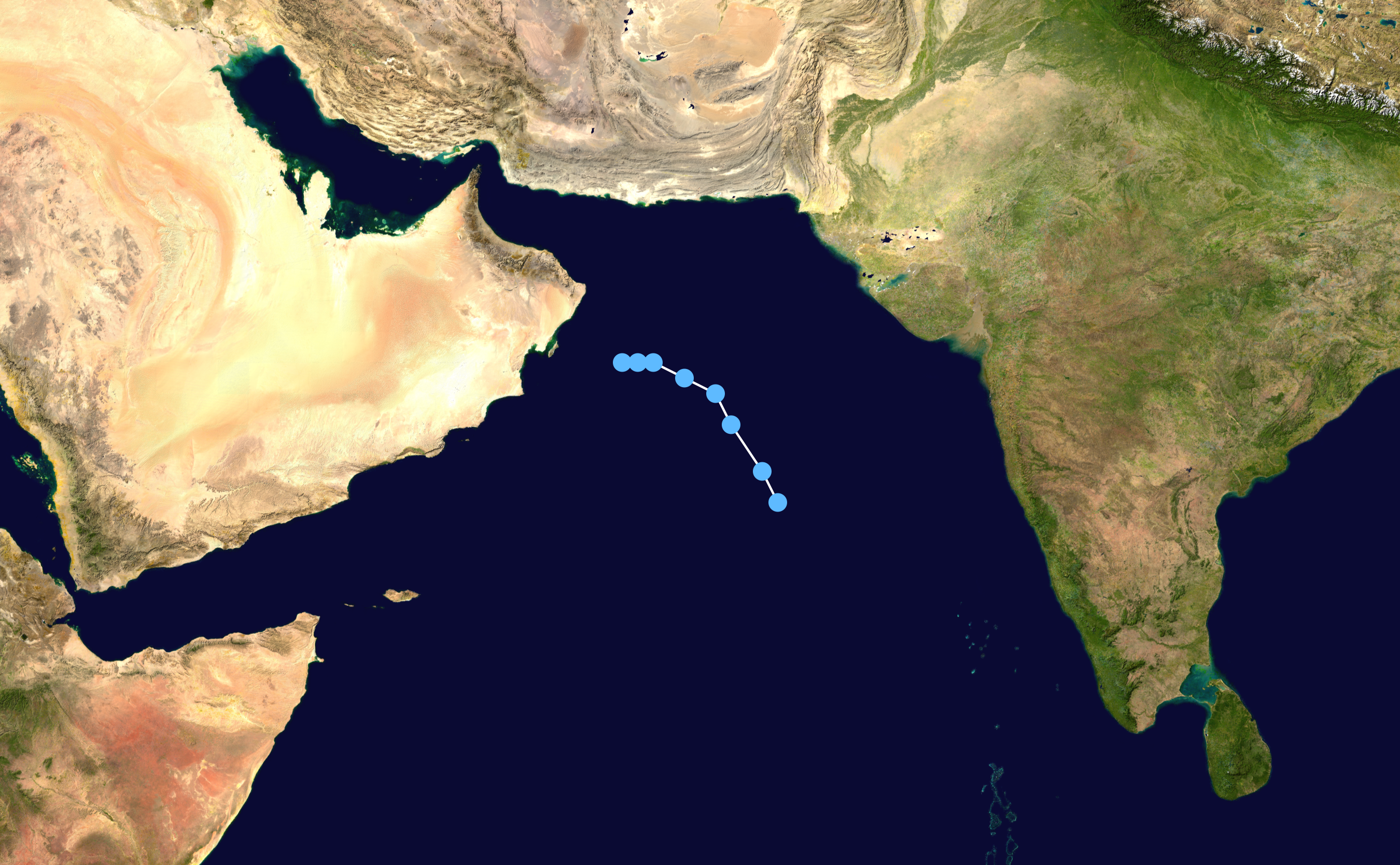
- Duration: June 5 – June 7
- Peak intensity: 45 km/h (30 mph) (3-min); 994 hPa (mbar)

In early July, the seasonal monsoon over the Arabian Sea strengthened; a trough developing around the same time off the coast of Karnataka increased the local pressure gradient. The interaction of these two systems led to the formation of a low over the southern Arabian Sea on June 4. Situated in a region of low to moderate wind shear, upper-level divergence, and convergence, the low consolidated into a depression the following day while situated roughly 880 km (550 mi) southwest of Mumbai, India. Little intensification occurred over the following day as it moved north-northwestward; the depression attained peak winds of 45 km/h (30 mph) and a pressure of 994 mbar (hPa; 29.35 inHg). Late on June 6 and into the early hours of June 7, interaction with land caused significant weakening, with the system degrading to a remnant low that morning. The remnants of the depression continued westward and brought locally heavy rains to parts of Oman.

=== Depression BOB 02 ===
- Depression (IMD)
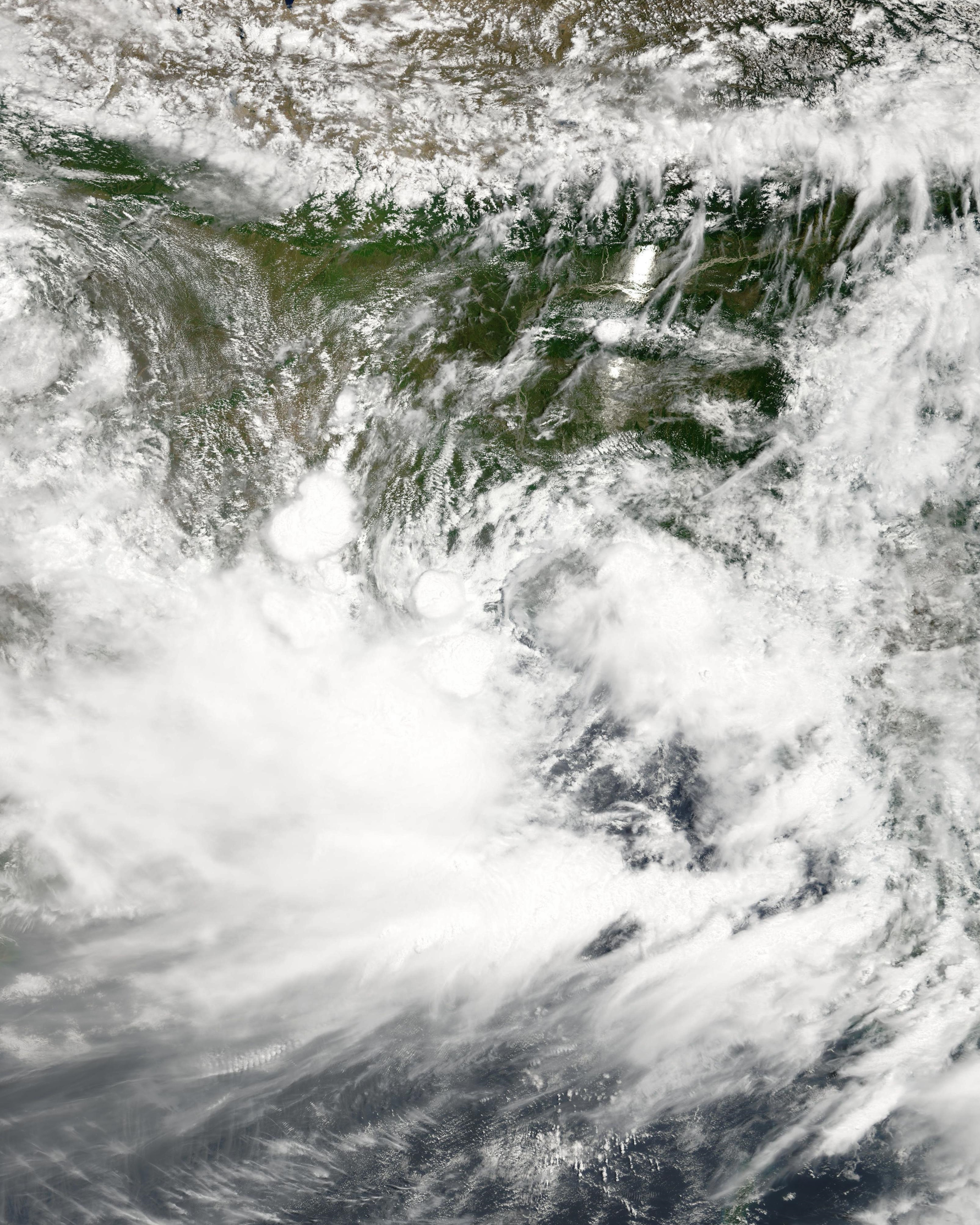
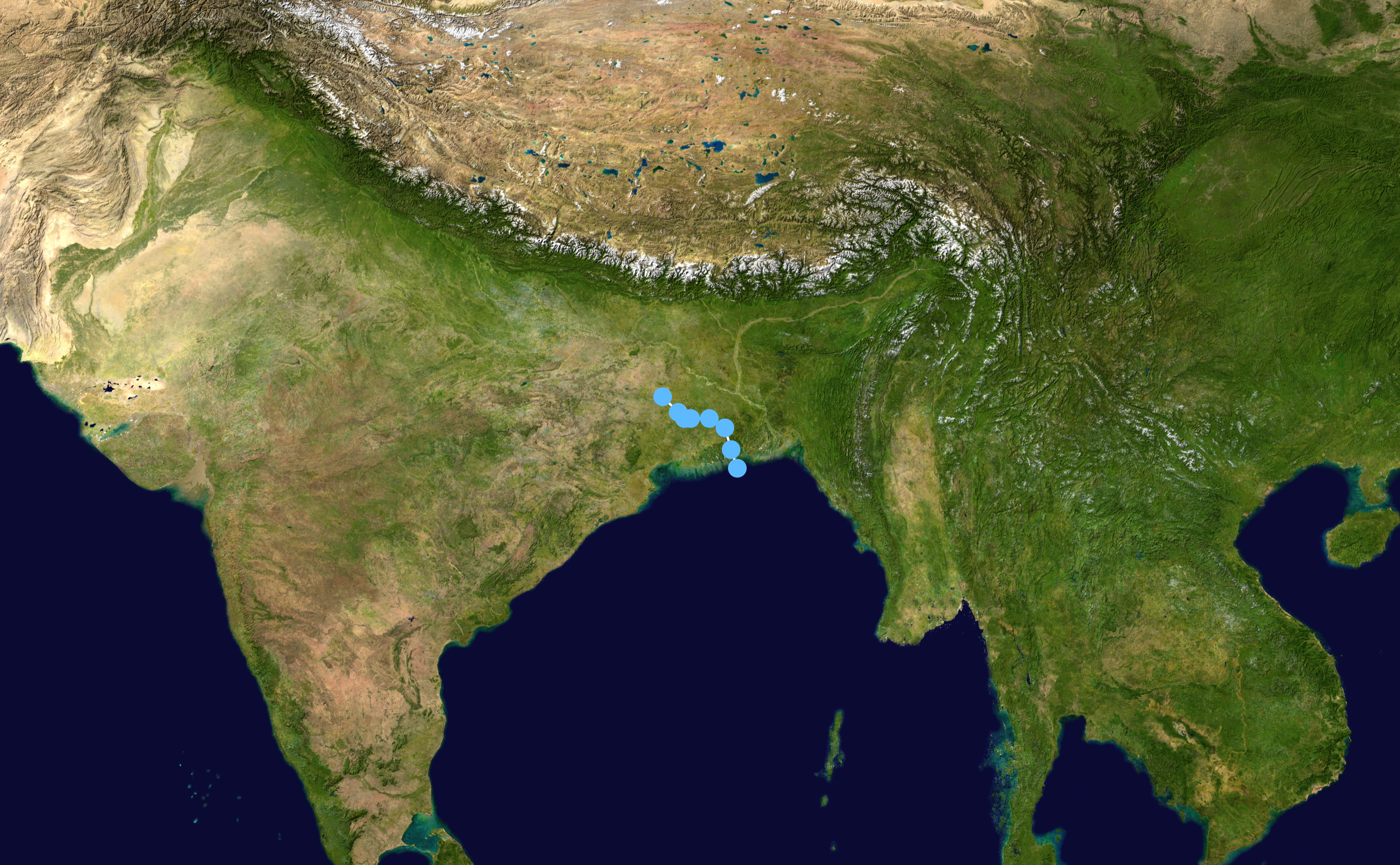
- Duration: June 16 – June 18
- Peak intensity: 45 km/h (30 mph) (3-min); 988 hPa (mbar)

Early on June 15, an area of low pressure formed within the monsoonal trough over the northern part of the Bay of Bengal. Over the next 24 hours deep convection developed around the low-pressure area and thus it was upgraded to Depression BOB 02 early the next day, as it was located about 220 km (140 mi), southeast of Kolkata, near to the Bangladesh coastline. However it as the depression was located within an area of moderate to high vertical wind shear, it did not develop further. Later that morning before the depression made landfall it reached its peak intensity with a central pressure of 988 hPa/mbar. The depression then made landfall on the Bangladesh coast and slowly weakened into an area of low pressure, whilst located over Jharkhand in India.

Torrential rains associated with the depression fell across much of Assam, Orissa, West Bengal, and Jharkhand. A maximum of 720 mm (28 in) of rain fell in Kalaikunda Air Force Station in West Bengal in 48 hours between 17 and 18 June of which 530 mm fell on 18 June. Additional rains spread into Himachal, Uttarakhand, and Arunachal pradeshes. In Assam, the Brahmaputra River overtopped its banks and flooded 350 villages, affecting roughly 400,000 people. At least 23 people lost their lives in the region. In nearby Arunachal, a series of landslides near Itanagar killed 19 people and injured 15 others. Flooding around Midnapore, West Bengal, killed at least nine people while 21,000 others were affected. Across northeast India, approximately 8 million people were affected by the floods, of which 2 million were rendered homeless. At least 56 people lost their lives, 31 of which occurred West Bengal.

=== Depression BOB 03 ===
- Depression (IMD)
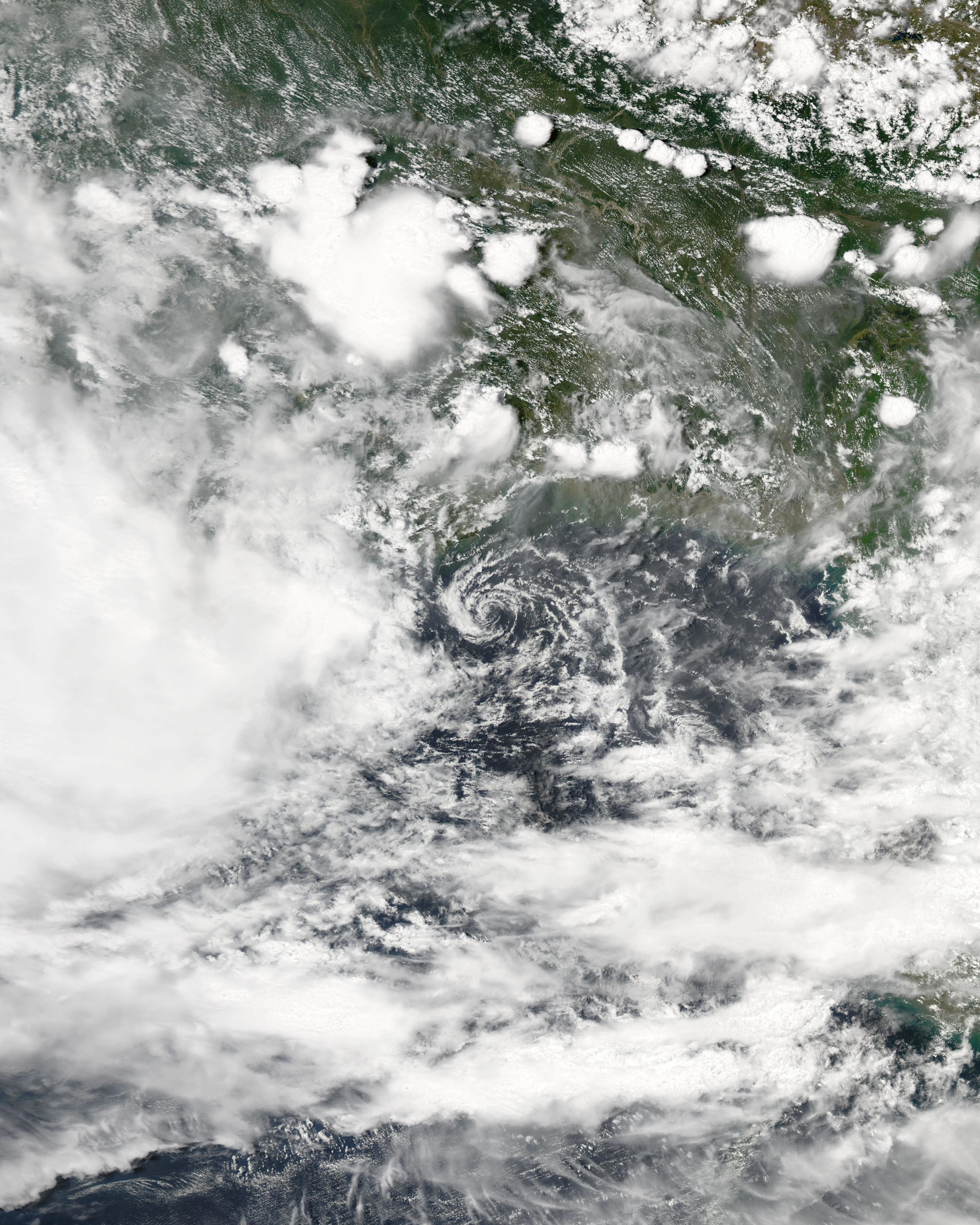
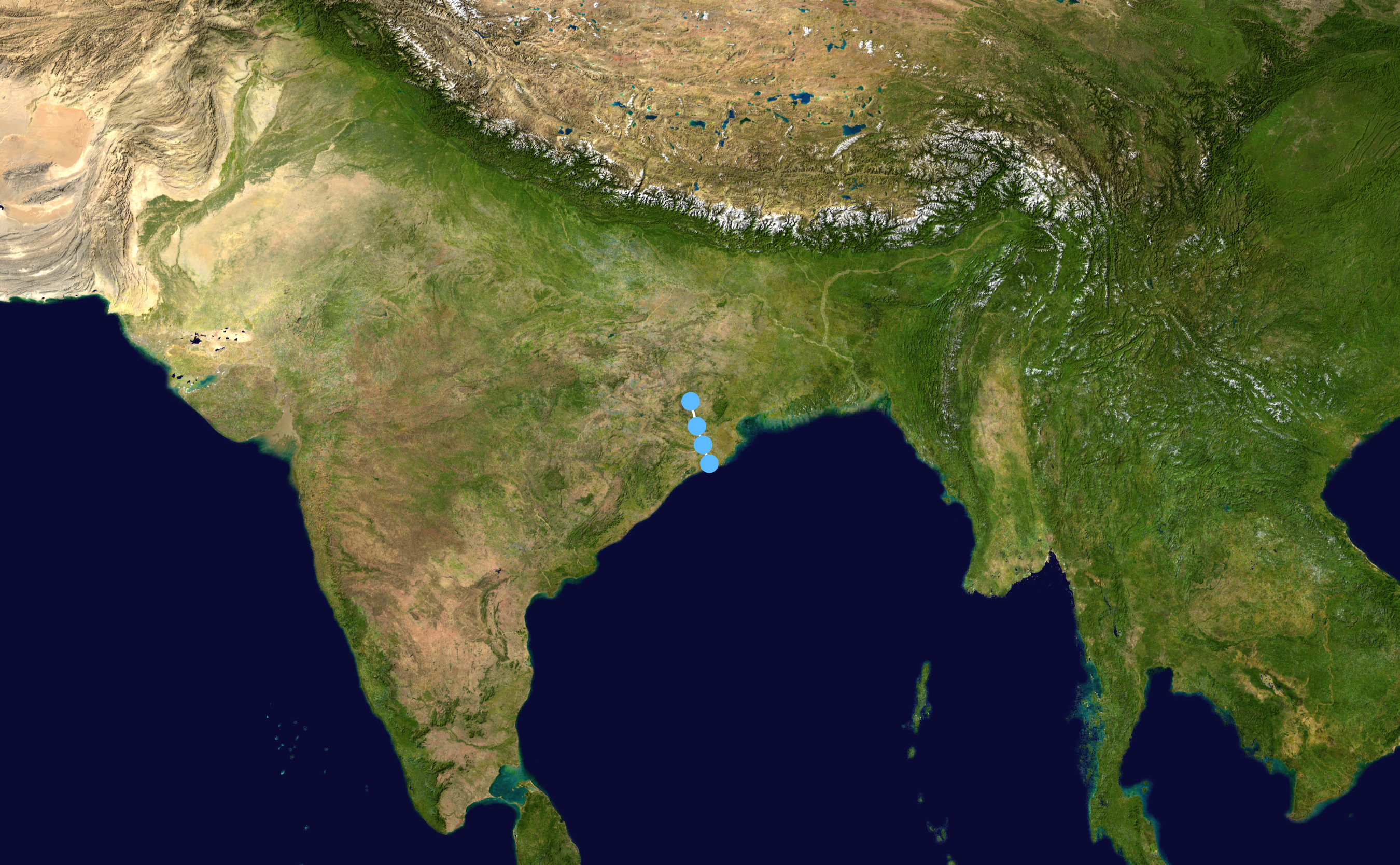
- Duration: August 9 – August 10
- Peak intensity: 45 km/h (30 mph) (3-min); 1004 hPa (mbar)

On August 9, a tropical depression formed in the North Indian Ocean, south of Orissa, India. Early the next day, the depression made landfall on the Orissa coast. The IMD did not upgrade it until it was overland near Puri. Consequently, it was designated as a land depression in the end of monsoon season report. Later in the day, the IMD issued its final advisory on the depression as it weakened into a low-pressure area. Madanpur Rampur in Orissa received 220 mm of rainfall on 9 August.

Monsoonal rainfall associated with the depression triggered extensive flooding in Andhra Pradesh. Flash flooding occurred on many rivers throughout the state. At least 61 people were killed across the state and 40,000 were displaced from their homes. At 3,000 homes were flooded.

=== Deep Depression BOB 04 ===
- Deep depression (IMD)
- Tropical storm (SSHWS)
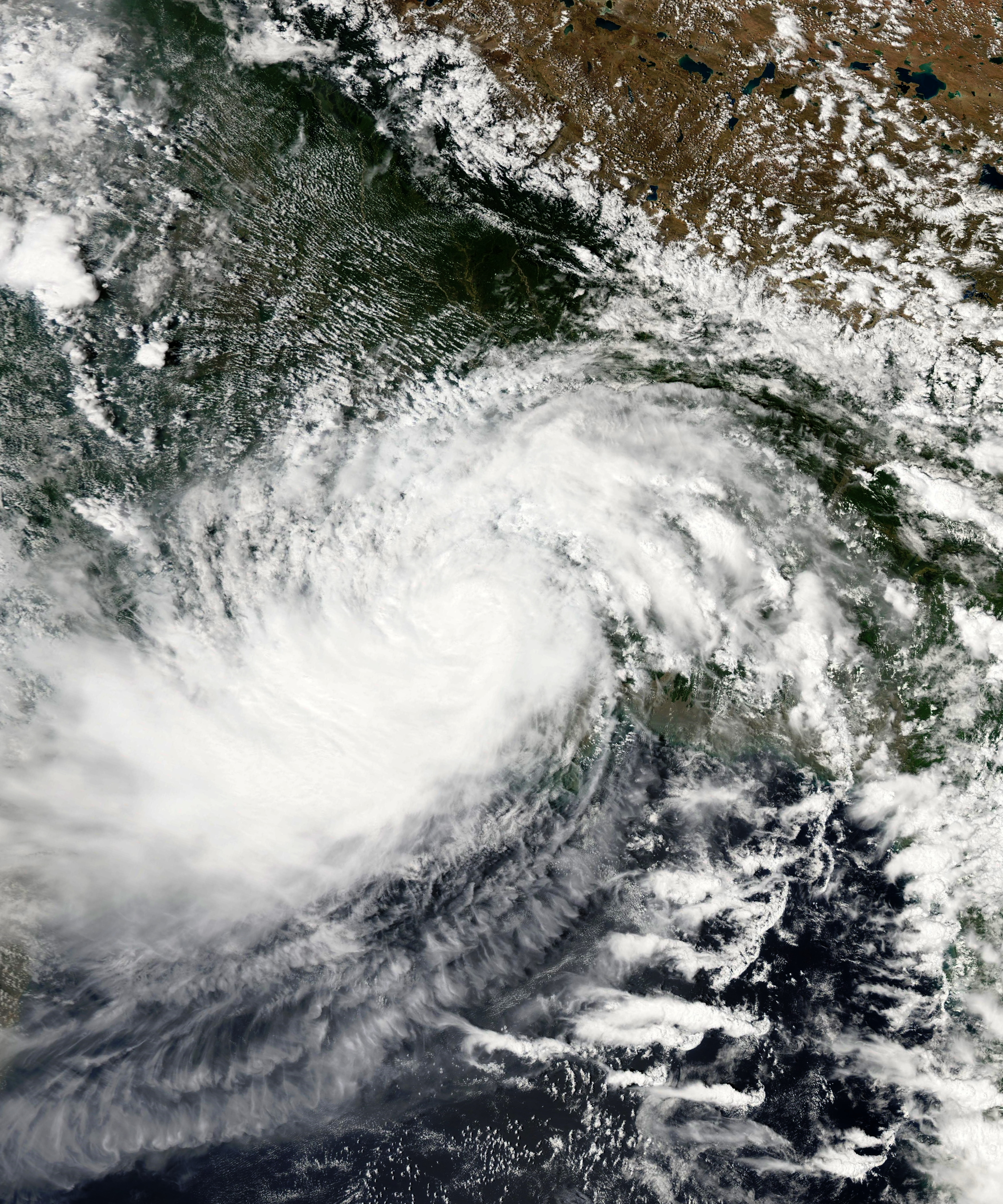
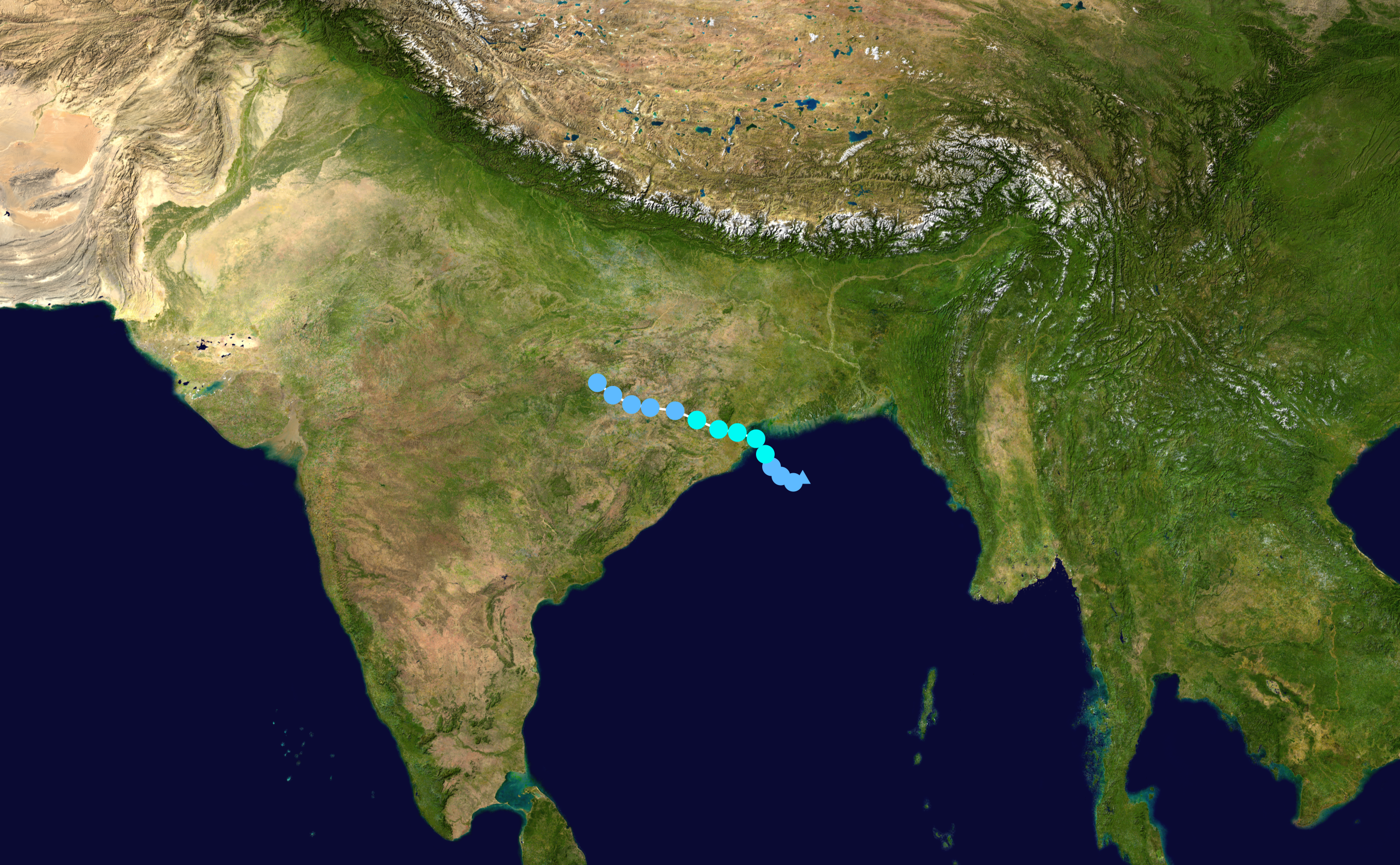
- Duration: September 15 – September 19
- Peak intensity: 55 km/h (35 mph) (3-min); 986 hPa (mbar)

On September 14 an area of low pressure formed southeast of Kolkata, India. During September 15 the IMD designated this area of low pressure as Depression BOB 04. Later that day the JTWC issued a Tropical Cyclone Formation Alert on the tropical depression. During the morning of September 15 the depression intensified into a Deep Depression as it moved closer to the Orissa Coast near Chandbali on 16 September and maximum surface wind of 40 knots (74 km/h) was reported by Chandbali at 1700 UTC of 16 September. Later that day the JTWC issued their first advisory on this system designating it as Tropical Cyclone 02B The Depression then made landfall on the Orissa coast later that day. So the JTWC issued their last advisory on the depression later that day. However the IMD kept issuing advisories on the Deep Depression. The RSMC then downgraded it to a depression on September 18 as it moved further inland. The RSMC issued their final advisory the next day as the depression had weakened into a well marked low-pressure area. The track of Deep Depression making inland into Uttar Pradesh after crossing Orissa

Baliguda in Orissa received 430 mm of rainfall in 48 hours between 17 and 18 September. The Deep Depression caused 10 deaths in the state of Orissa. The Depression also caused 15 deaths in Uttar Pradesh, its state capital Lucknow received the heaviest rains for September in the last 10 years. Over 100 fishermen were reported missing as 25 trawlers capsized in the Bay of Bengal off Bangladesh's southern coastal areas as the sea turned rough due to a depression. The Deep Depression also caused storm surge up to 15 to 20 feet high.

Overall, the storm killed at least 25 people in India (10 in Orissa, 15 in Uttar Pradesh), but overall damage was minor.

=== Deep Depression ARB 02 ===
- Deep depression (IMD)
- Tropical depression (SSHWS)
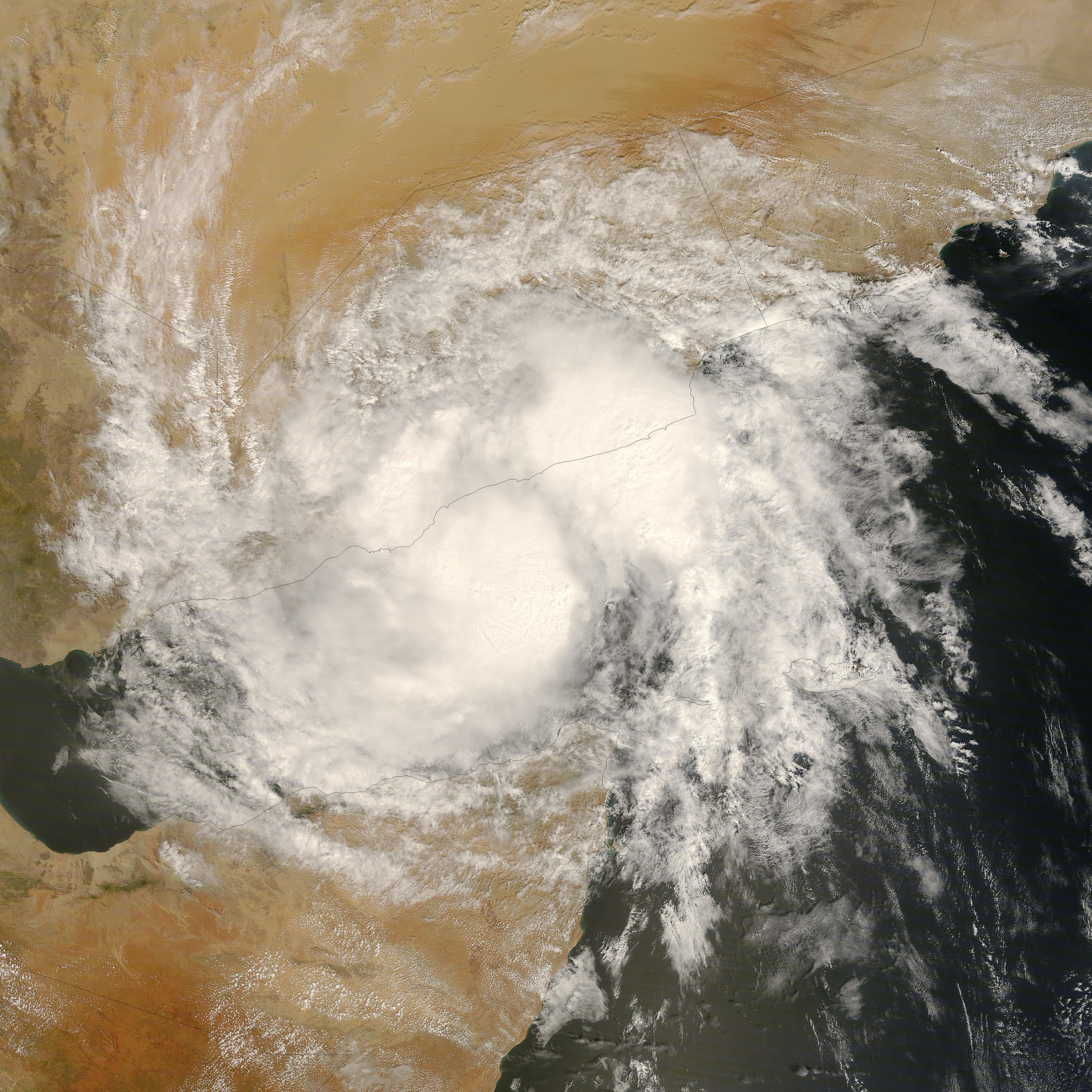
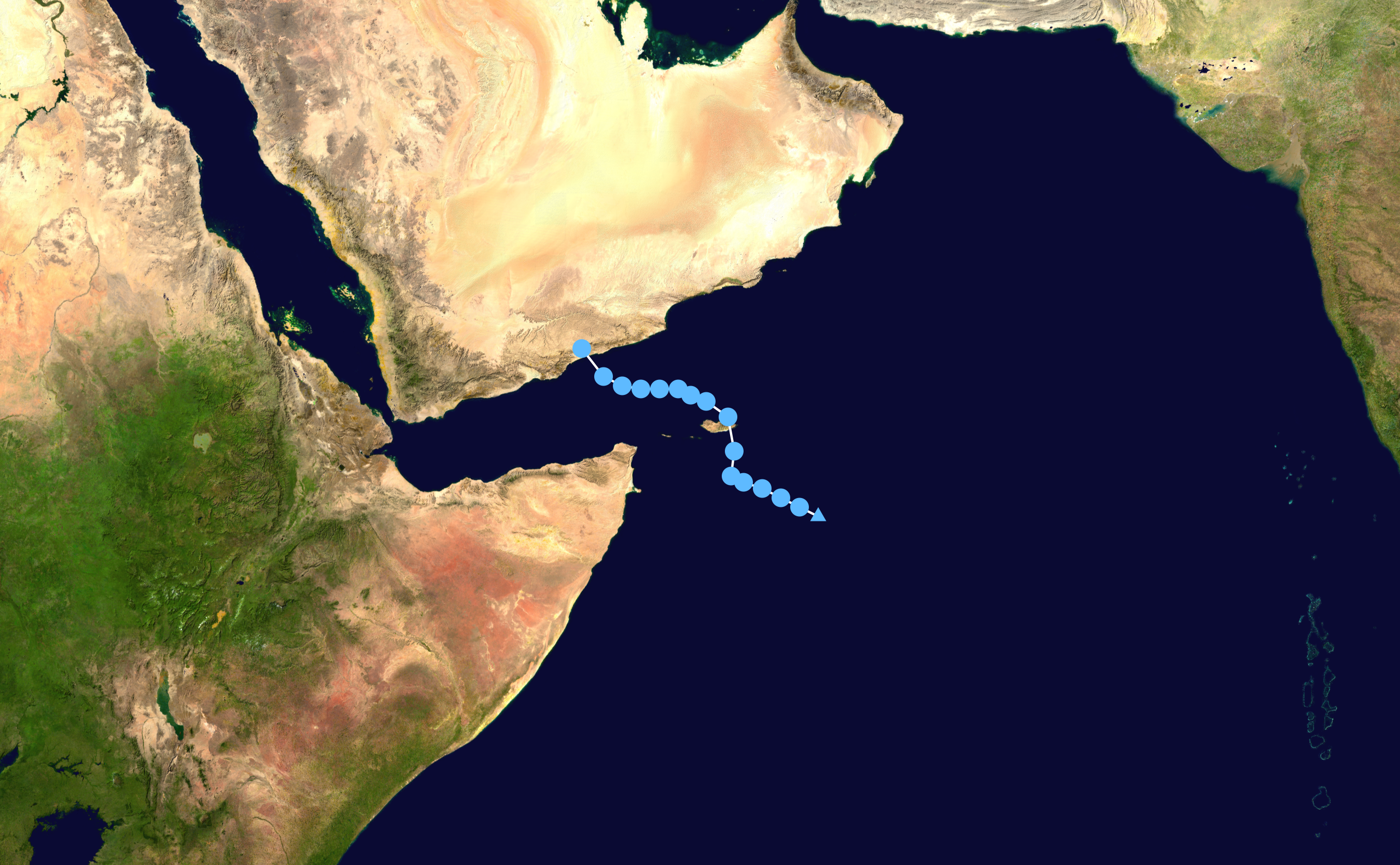
- Duration: October 19 – October 23
- Peak intensity: 55 km/h (35 mph) (3-min); 1000 hPa (mbar)

On October 19 the IMD noted that an area of low pressure which located to the south east of Salalah, Oman had intensified into a tropical depression and was assigned the number ARB 02. On October 21 IMD updated the system to a Deep Depression while it lay 700 km south of Salalah, Oman near the east coast of Somalia. It lost its strength while crossing the Gulf of Aden due to entry of dry air and land interaction as it passed close to the northeastern coast of Somalia. It later was downgraded to a Depression, named TC 03B by the JTWC.

On October 24 it made landfall on the south-eastern coast of Yemen, leaving at least 26 civilians and six soldiers dead while trapping hundreds of people due to flooding and torrential rainfalls. The latest figure of casualties is of 180 persons dead and 100 others missing, mostly from the region of Hadhramawt, where the storm made landfall. 733 houses were destroyed in the governorates of Hadhramawt and Al-Mahrah, while 22,000 people were displaced. The Yemeni Government declared the two aforementioned governorates as disaster zones. The most affected areas map released by ReliefWeb.

Overall, this weak storm killed at least 180 people in Yemen. Damage is estimated at $1.638 billion (US$).

=== Cyclonic Storm Rashmi ===
- Cyclonic storm (IMD)
- Tropical storm (SSHWS)
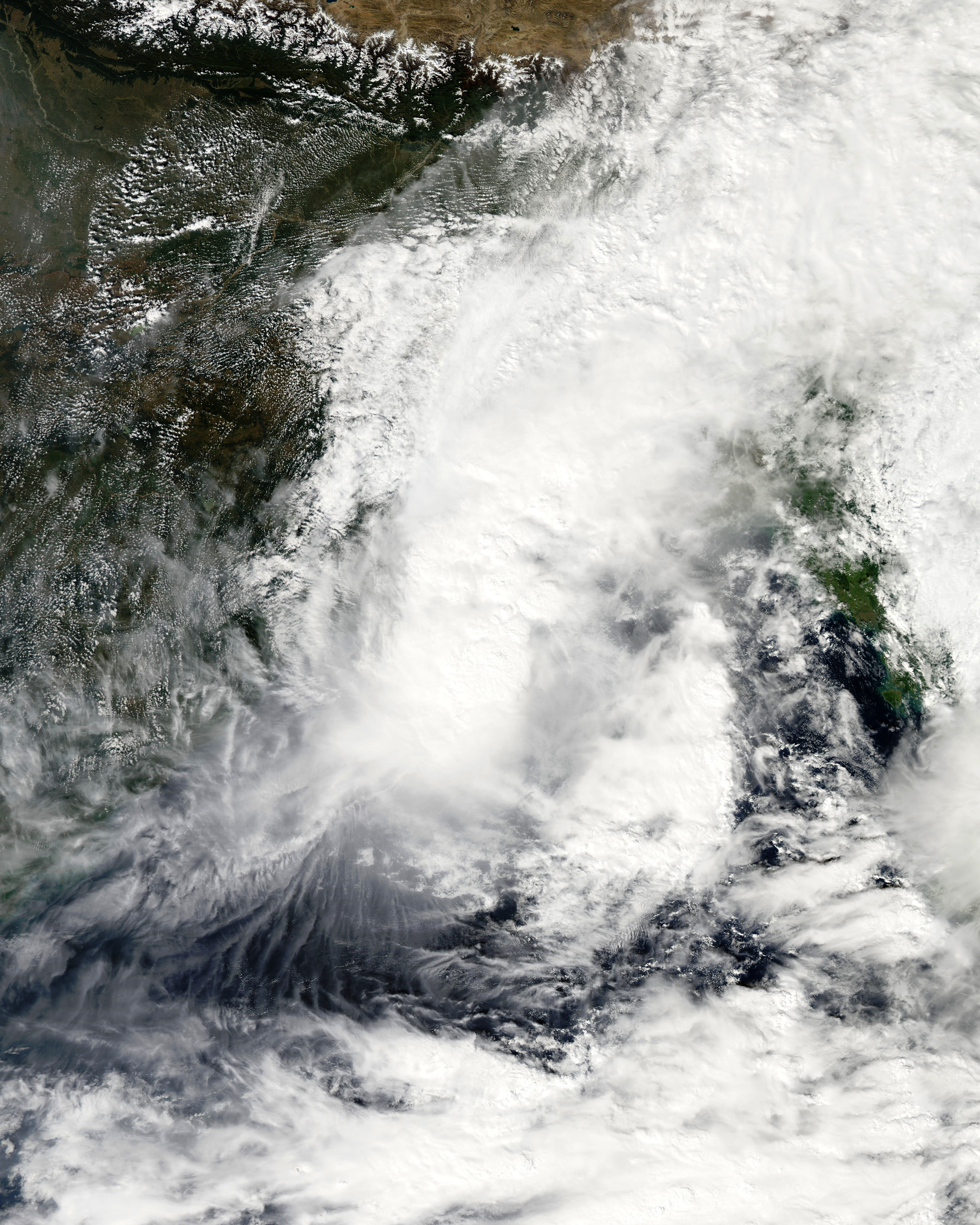
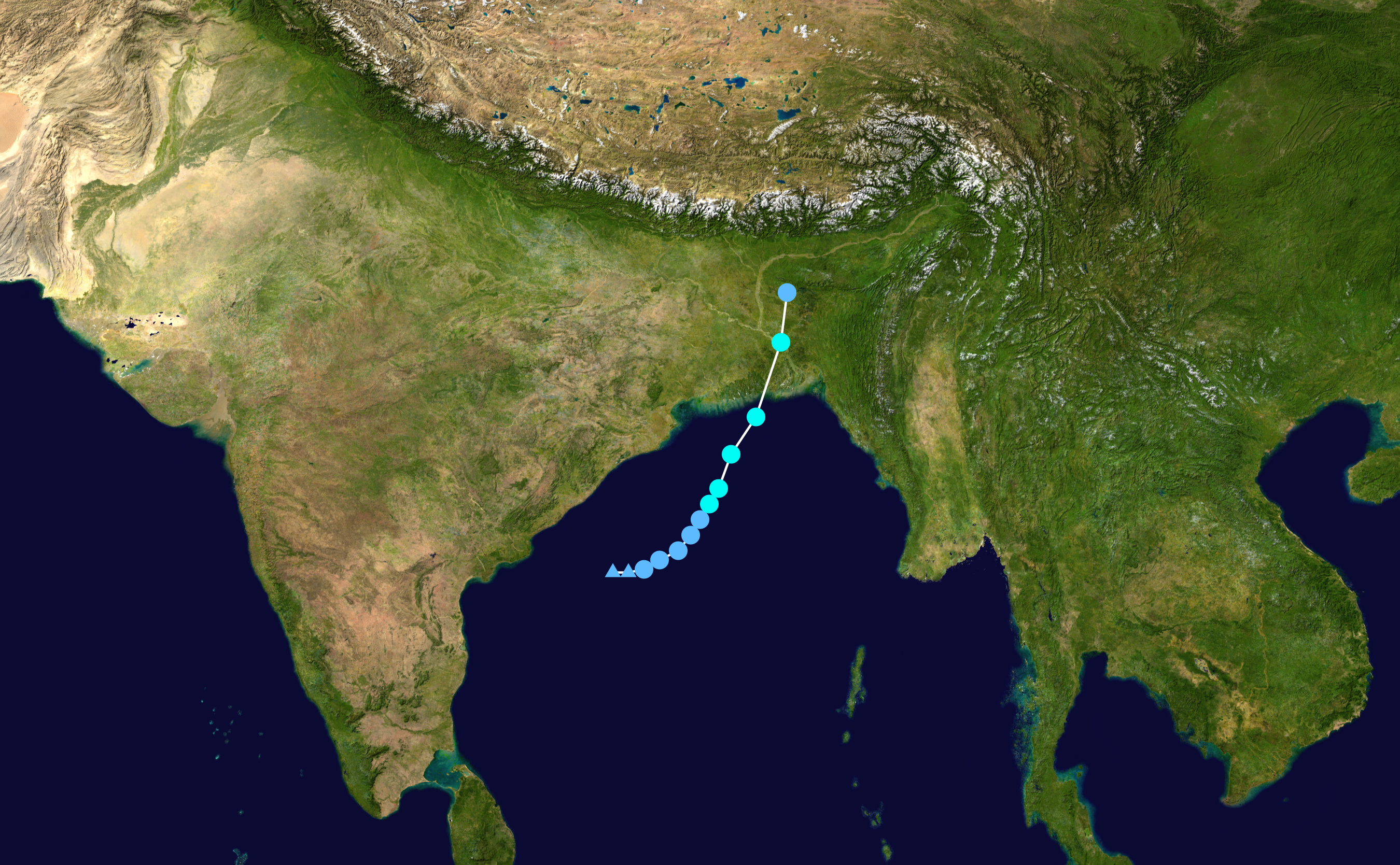
- Duration: October 25 – October 27
- Peak intensity: 85 km/h (50 mph) (3-min); 996 hPa (mbar)

On October 25, an area of low pressure which was located east of the Andhra Pradesh coast based on satellite, coastal observations, and buoy data intensified into a depression. The depression remained practically stationary and intensified into a deep depression about 400 km east-northeast of Visakhapatnam, 250 km south-southeast of Paradip and 550 km south-southwest of Kolkata the next day. The Joint Typhoon Warning Center began issuing advisories on the system a few hours later that early morning, designating it as Tropical Cyclone 04B. The IMD later assigned the name Rashmi after it intensified into a cyclonic storm. (Note: The name Rashmi (Sinhala: රශ්මි, [raʃmi]) was contributed by Sri Lanka and means "ray of light" in Sinhala.) Rashmi later made landfall in the Khulna–Barisal coast at Patharghata, Bangladesh on October 27. After rapidly weakening, Rashmi degenerated into a low pressure system shortly after landfall.

Chatgaon in Bangladesh reported about 50 knots (93 km/h) winds at the time of landfall. 15 people were killed and thousands of homes were also damaged. Rashmi brought down electrical and telephone poles and uprooted trees, large areas of acres of crops were also destroyed. 5 people were also killed in the state of Meghalaya, India. At least 50 fishermen were reported missing when about 15 fishing trawlers capsized offshore.

Rashmi killed at least 28 people. 15 people were killed in Bangladesh and 13 people were killed in India (5 in Meghalaya, 8 in Arunachal Pradesh).

=== Cyclonic Storm Khai-Muk ===
- Cyclonic storm (IMD)
- Tropical storm (SSHWS)
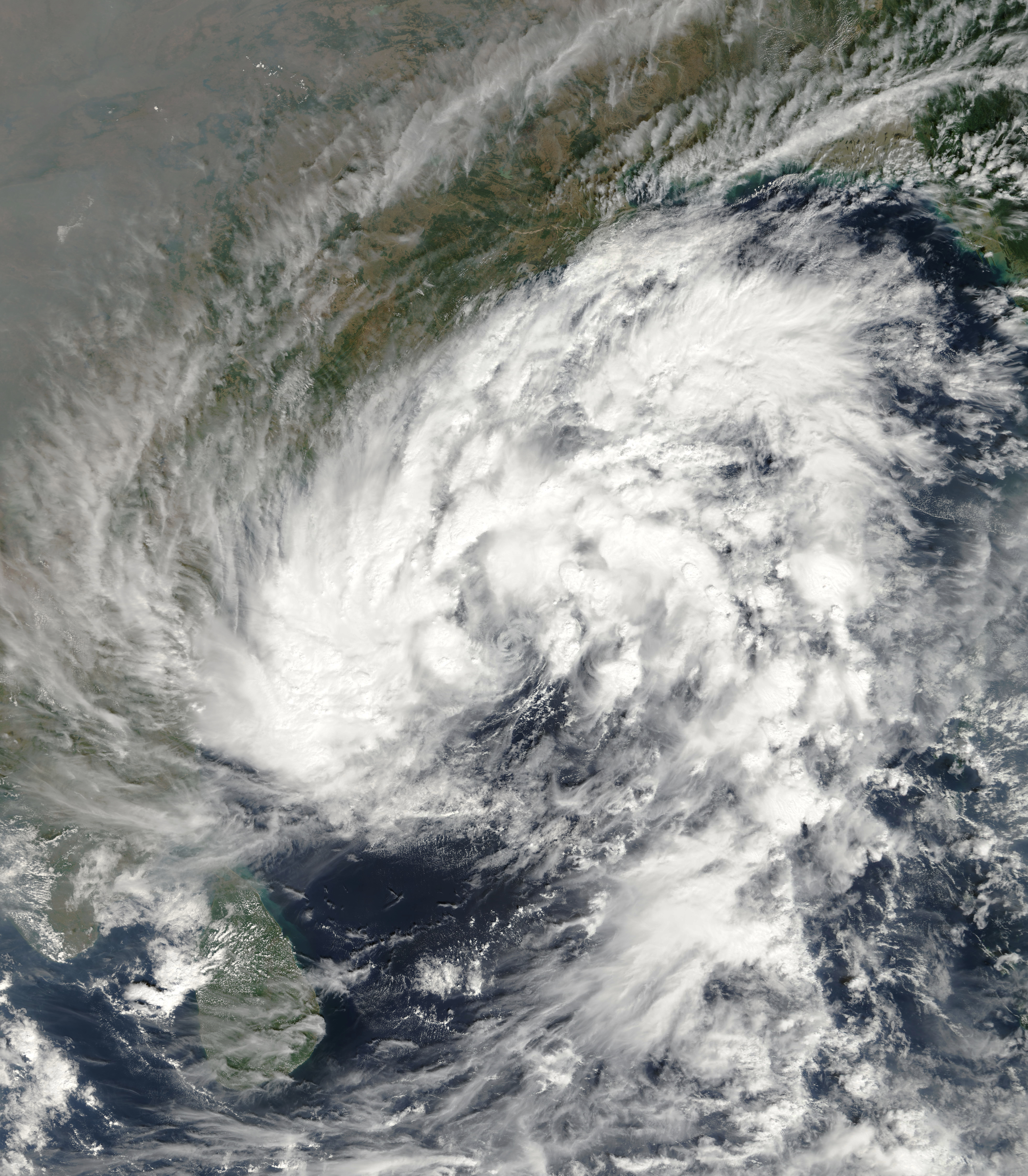
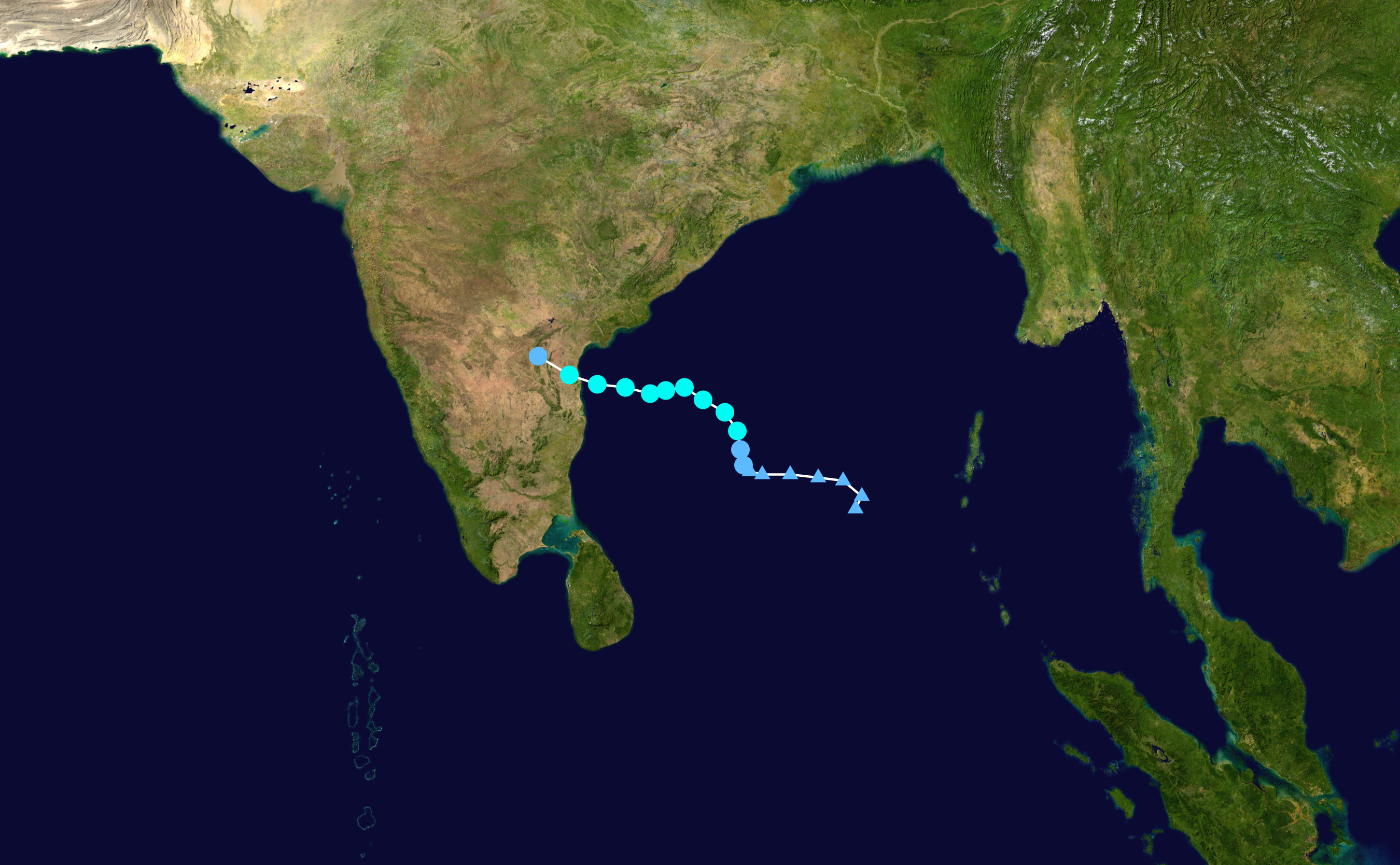
- Duration: November 13 – November 16
- Peak intensity: 65 km/h (40 mph) (3-min); 996 hPa (mbar)

On November 13, a low-pressure area identified by the India Meteorological Department over southeast Bay of Bengal and adjoining areas concentrated into a depression east-southeast of Chennai, India. The IMD expected the system to intensify further and move towards north Tamil-Nadu/south Andhra Pradesh coasts. The Joint Typhoon Warning Center issued a tropical cyclone warning on the tropical cyclone early on November 14 naming it as Tropical Cyclone 05B. A few hours later the IMD upgraded the system to a deep depression issuing a Cyclone Watch for Andhra Pradesh as intensification into a cyclonic storm was possible. By mid morning the IMD advised the eastern coast of India that the system was expected to cross Andhra Pradesh by noon the next day (local time). Later that morning the deep depression intensified into a cyclonic storm and was named Khai-Muk (Note: The name Khai-Muk (Thai: ไข่มุก, [kʰaj˨˩ muk̚˦˥]) was contributed by Thailand and means "pearl" in Thai.) and the cyclone watch was raised to a warning for Andhra Pradesh coast with Khai-Muk forecast to intensify even further before it made landfall on November 15 in south Andhra Pradesh coast close to the north of Kavali. However, the system became sheared to the western periphery and the IMD downgraded it back into a deep depression. Khai-Muk headed northwest and then northwards after making landfall in Andhra Pradesh.

By November 15, all ports in Andhra Pradesh were under cautionary signal number three. All fishermen were advised to remain at port due to rough seas. Residents along the shore were urged to evacuate as waves up to 2 m (6.6 ft) were forecast to impact the coast.

High winds knocked down trees and power lines causing traffic jams throughout the Andhra Pradesh. Boats and fishing nets were washed away by high waves produced by Khai-Muk, costing Rs. 2 cores (US$430,000). An average of 53.5 millimetres (2.11 in) of rain fell throughout the state. The highest rainfall was recorded in Polavaram at 230 mm on 17 November. An estimated 1.2 million hectares of crops were damaged or destroyed by the storm leading to Rs. 10 cores (US$1.9 million) in agricultural losses. A total of 148 homes were destroyed and another 23 were damaged, amounting to Rs. 4 crores (US$780,000) in monetary losses. A 5 km (3.1 mi) stretch of highway was washed out by the storm and damages to the road amounted to Rs. 4 crores (US$780,000).

A state of high alert was declared in Andhra Pradesh following the storm in the state. About 7,500 people were evacuated from several towns to 23 shelters set up by officials. The shelters provided the residents with breakfast and milk on November 16. The following day, a total of 44,949 people had evacuated to 66 relief shelters. The minister of Andhra requested that the government send rice, pulses, oil and other materials to cyclone victims.

=== Cyclonic Storm Nisha ===
- Cyclonic storm (IMD)
- Tropical storm (SSHWS)
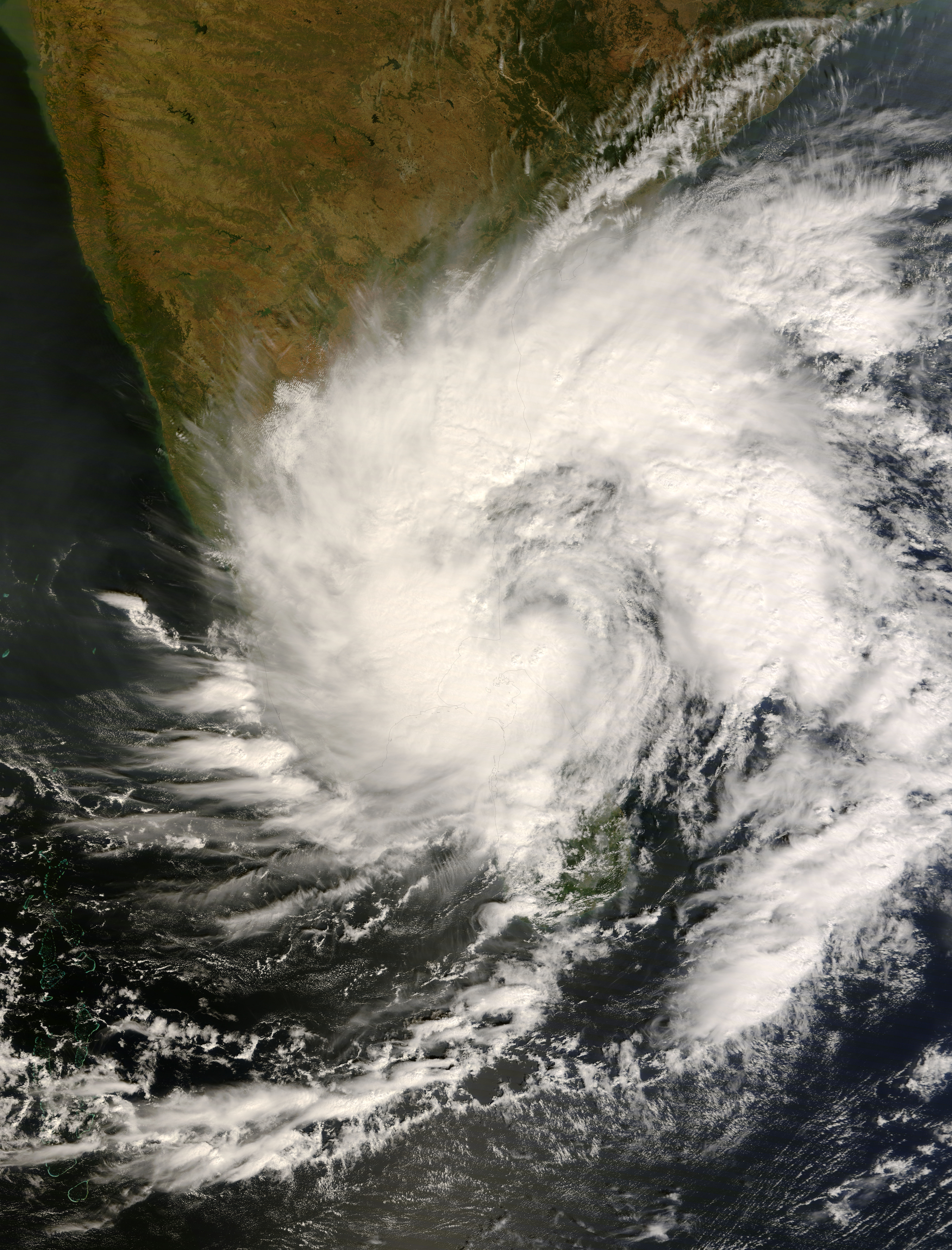
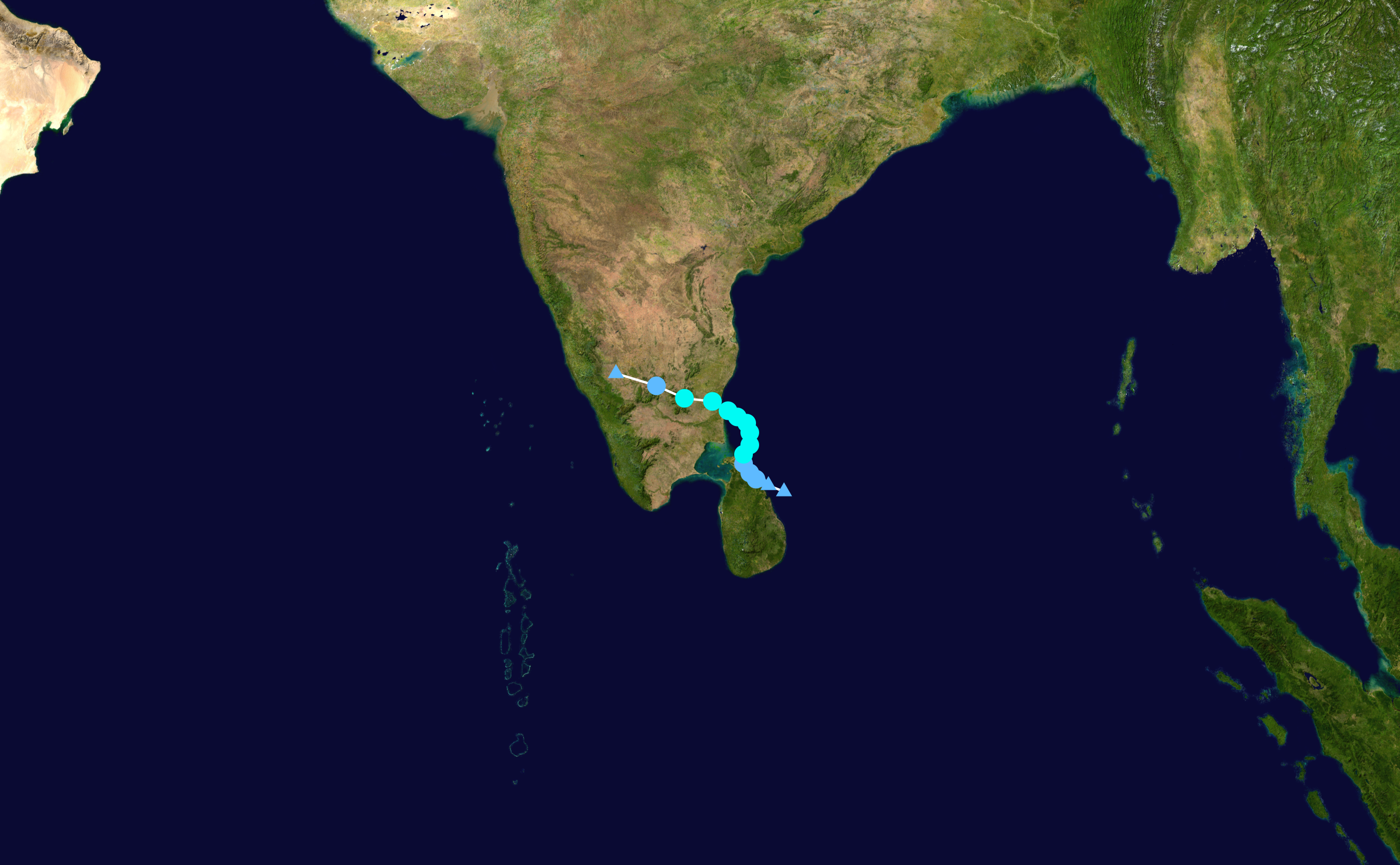
- Duration: November 25 – November 29
- Peak intensity: 85 km/h (50 mph) (3-min); 996 hPa (mbar)

Late in the morning of November 25, India Meteorological Department satellite imageries, including surface observations from Sri Lanka and coastal stations of Tamil Nadu, indicated that a depression had formed over Sri Lanka in southwest Bay of Bengal. The depression remained nearly stationary and intensified into a deep depression three hours later. The IMD posted a cyclone watch for Tamil Nadu region of India noting that the system was likely to intensify into a cyclonic storm and cross Tamil Nadu coast between Pamban and Nagapattinam by tomorrow night. Very late in the day the IMD mentioned that the deep depression would intensify, however the cyclone watch for Tamil Nadu coast was lowered (or not mentioned) in the bulletin issued. Early on November 26, the deep depression close to Tamil Nadu coast intensified into a cyclonic storm and was named Nisha. (Note: The name Nisha (Bengali: নিশা; [ˈniʃaˑ]) was contributed by Bangladesh and means night in Bengali.) It crossed the coast close to the north of Karaikal between 0530 and 0630 hours IST on November 27 and Karaikal reported 35 knots (65 km/h) at the time of landfall. On November 28, JTWC issued their final warning. Nisha headed northwest towards south Karnataka after making landfall in Tamil Nadu.

15 people have been killed when Nisha hit northern Sri Lanka on November 25, 2008, causing heavy rains and flooding that reportedly displaced between 60,000 and 70,000 people in Vanni and 20,000 people in Jaffna district. Jaffna recorded the highest rainfall since 1918, of 520.1 mm of rain in last week, with Wednesday's reading of 389.8 mm, being the highest in nine decades.

189 people were killed by the heavy rains and floods caused by the cyclone in Tamil Nadu and the death toll is expected to rise. Some places have recorded extreme rainfall, notably Orathanad, Thanjavur district where over 660 mm of rain fell within a period of 24 hours and broke the 65-year-old record of highest rainfall registered in 24 hours in Tamil Nadu. Previously the highest amount of rainfall in a day was 570 mm registered by Cuddalore on May 18, 1943. In two days, Orathanadu registered 990 mm of rainfall. Overall in 4 days between 25 and 28 November, Orathanadu got 1280 mm making it as the 4th wettest Cylone in India. The most affected areas map released by ReliefWeb.

Nisha killed 204 people making it the 4th deadliest storm in 2008 after Cyclone Nargis, Typhoon Fengshen and Hurricane Hanna. Damage is estimated at 3789 crores i.e. $800 million (US$).

=== Deep Depression BOB 08 ===
- Deep depression (IMD)
- Tropical storm (SSHWS)
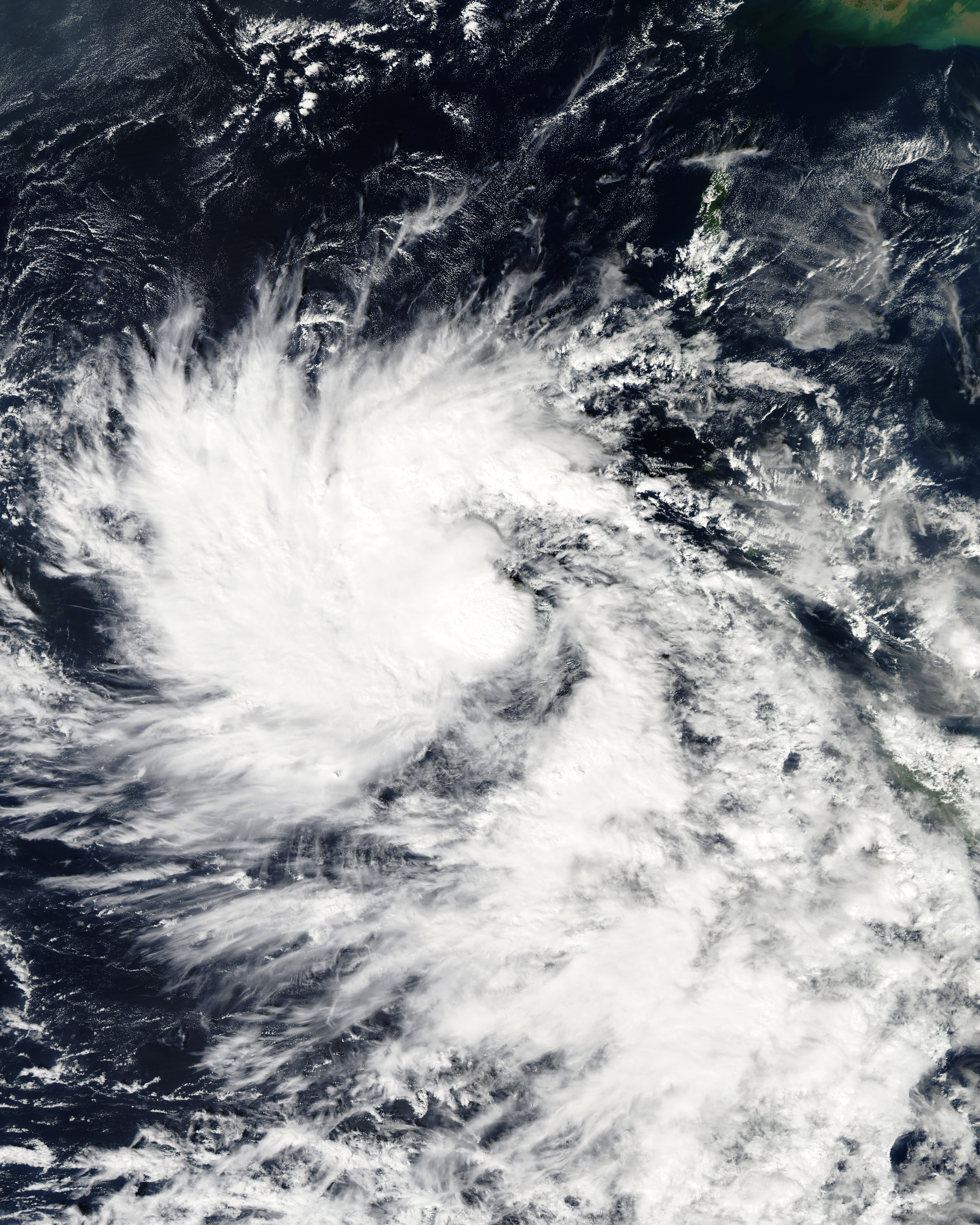
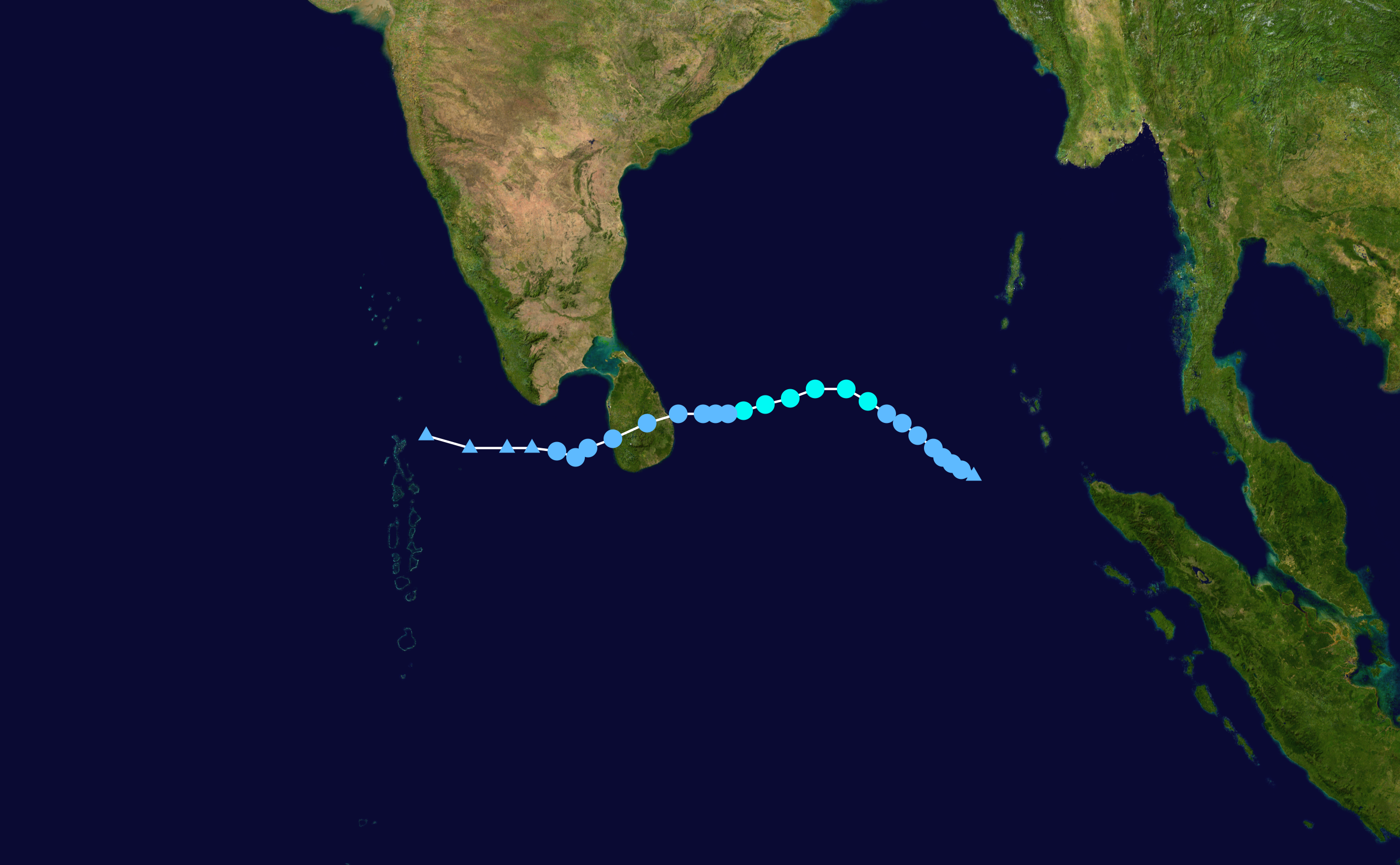
- Duration: December 4 – December 7
- Peak intensity: 55 km/h (35 mph) (3-min); 1004 hPa (mbar)

On December 3, an area of low pressure formed over the southern Bay of Bengal within the Intertropical Convergence Zone. The system was well organized with good convection present from the previous 48 hours. On December 4, the India Meteorological Department (IMD) upgraded the area of low pressure to a depression giving it the designation "BOB 08". At that time it was located approximately 650 kilometres (400 mi) south-southwest of Port Blair. That day, the Joint Typhoon Warning Center (JTWC) designated the system as Tropical Cyclone 07B. Early on December 5, the IMD upgraded Depression BOB 08 to a deep depression. On December 7, the IMD reported that BOB 08 weakened into a depression. The depression continued to weaken until it decayed into a remnant low late on the same day. Puducherry got 90 mm of rainfall on 9 December.

== Season effects ==
This table lists all the Depressions that developed in the North Indian Ocean during the 2008 season. The meteorological data is taken all from RSMC New Delhi and is rated using their intensity scale.

Name	Dates	Peak intensity			Areas affected	Damage (USD)	Deaths	Ref(s).
Name	Dates	Category	Wind speed	Pressure	Areas affected	Damage (USD)	Deaths	Ref(s).
Nargis	April 27 – May 3	Extremely Severe Cyclonic Storm	165 km/h (105 mph)	962 hPa (28.41 inHg)	Andaman and Nicobar Islands, Bangladesh, Myanmar, Thailand, Laos, Yunnan	$12.9 billion	138,373	
ARB 01	June 5–7	Depression	45 km/h (30 mph)	994 hPa (29.35 inHg)	Oman	None	0	
BOB 02	June 16–18	Depression	45 km/h (30 mph)	988 hPa (29.18 inHg)	India, Bangladesh	Unknown	54	
BOB 03	August 9–10	Land Depression	45 km/h (30 mph)	1,004 hPa (29.65 inHg)	India (Orissa, West Bengal)	Unknown	61	
BOB 04	September 14–19	Deep Depression	55 km/h (35 mph)	986 hPa (29.12 inHg)	India	Unknown	25	
ARB 02	October 19–23	Deep Depression	55 km/h (35 mph)	1,000 hPa (29.53 inHg)	Yemen	$1.64 billion	180	
Rashmi	October 25–27	Cyclonic Storm	85 km/h (55 mph)	984 hPa (29.06 inHg)	India, Bangladesh	Unknown	28	
Khai-Muk	November 13–16	Cyclonic Storm	65 km/h (40 mph)	996 hPa (29.41 inHg)	India (Andhra Pradesh)	$314 million	0	
Nisha	November 25–29	Cyclonic Storm	85 km/h (55 mph)	996 hPa (29.41 inHg)	Sri Lanka, India (Tamil Nadu)	$594 million	204	
BOB 08	December 4–8	Deep Depression	55 km/h (35 mph)	996 hPa (29.41 inHg)	Sri Lanka, India	None	0	
Season aggregates
10 systems	April 27 – December 8		165 km/h (105 mph)	962 hPa (28.41 inHg)		$15.3 billion	138,927	

== See also ==
- North Indian Ocean tropical cyclone
- Tropical cyclones in 2008
- 2008 Atlantic hurricane season
- 2008 Pacific hurricane season
- 2008 Pacific typhoon season
- South-West Indian Ocean cyclone seasons: 2007–08, 2008–09
- Australian region cyclone seasons: 2007–08, 2008–09
- South Pacific cyclone seasons: 2007–08, 2008–09
