= Rashmi Uday Singh =

Indian food expert, TV host and author (born 1955)

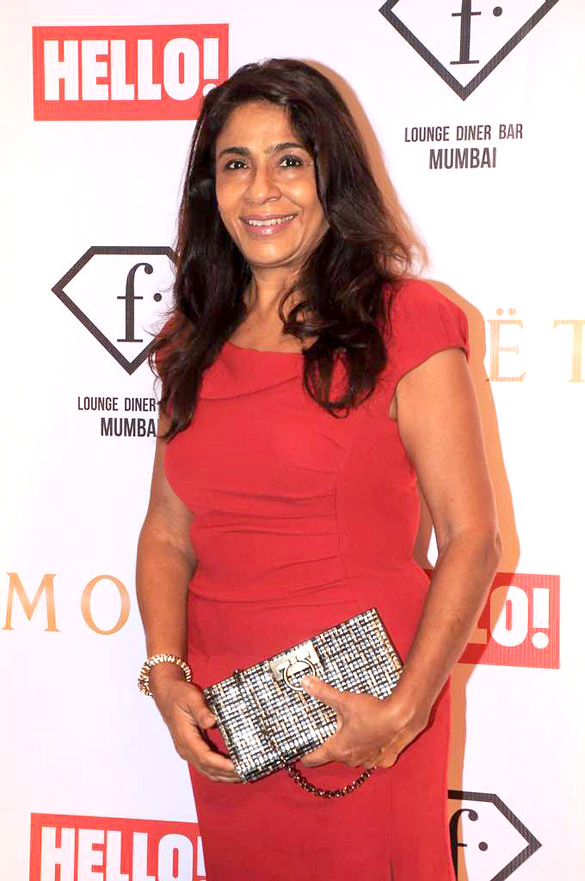
- Rashmi Uday Singh in 2012
- Born: 29 January 1955 (age 71); India
- Education: Lady Shri Ram College for Women; Government Law College, Mumbai
- Occupations: Author, columnist, novelist former indian revenue service officer 1977 batch
- Awards: Ordre des Arts et des Lettres
- Website: rashmiudaysingh.com

Rashmi Uday Singh is an Indian food expert TV host and author.

== Career ==
As a food expert she focuses on vegetarianism and health. She has authored more than 40 books. She has won Gourmand World Cookbook award and Chevalier dans l'Ordre des Arts et des Lettres from the government of France.

=== Television ===
On national Television, Singh has produced, scripted, directed and hosted 52 episodes of "Health Today" on DD Metro. Her Food TV shows (hosted and filmed in India and internationally) include "Foodie Fundas with Rashmi" (Headlines Today) "Delicious Discoveries with Rashmi" (ET Now) and "The Foodie" (Times Now). Singh also did political and financial reporting for "Aaj tak" “Business Baatein" and "Newstrack".

== Books ==
- Around the World in 80 plates: The Gourmet's Guide to Vegetarian Cuisine
- A Vegetarian in Paris
- Times Food Guide - Mumbai
- Mumbai by Night
- Heinz Good Food Guide 2003
- Lifegiver: the biography of the legendary obstetrician and gynaecologist
- The Metro plus Food guide
- Midday Good food Guide 1997
- The Oberoi-Penguin Celebrity Cookbook
- The Midday Good food Guide to Mumbai, 2000
- The Midday Good food Guide to Pune, 2000 - 2001
- Rashmi Uday Singh's Chicken Cookbook
- The Penguin celebrity cookbook
- Times Food & Nightlife Guide Mumbai 2013
- Times Food & Nightlife Guide Mumbai 2014
- Times Food & Nightlife Guide Mumbai 2015
- Times Food & Nightlife Guide Mumbai 2016
- Times Food & Nightlife Guide Mumbai 2017
- Times Food & Nightlife Guide Mumbai 2018

== Awards ==
- Chevalier dans l’Ordre des Arts et des Lettres (Knight of the Ordre des Arts et des Lettres).
