= Rashmi C. Desai =

Indian-American physicist

Rashmi C. Desai was an Indian-Canadian physicist, professor emeritus of physics at the University of Toronto.

He first studied physics at the University of Mumbai, where he obtained a Bachelor of Science degree in 1957. He worked as a scientific officer at the Bhabha Atomic Research Centre in Mumbai, India, from 1957 to 1962.

He then moved to the US and earned a Ph.D from Cornell University, Ithaca, New York, in 1966 before working as a research associate at the Massachusetts Institute of Technology in Cambridge, Massachusetts from 1966 to 1968. In the latter year he joined the University of Toronto as an assistant professor, becoming a full professor in 1978, a position he held until his retirement in 2004.

== Awards and accolades ==
From the University of Toronto, Desai was awarded the status of Fellow of the American Physical Society in 2001 after being nominated by the Topical Group on Statistical and Nonlinear Physics, for applications of statistical mechanics to materials science, including: phase separation and ordering kinetics in systems with competing interactions, Langmuir films, ferromagnetic films, epitaxially grown solid films, order-order transitions in polymers.

== See also ==
- List of fellows of the American Physical Society (1998–2010)
