= Cyclone Rashmi =

2008 North Indian tropical cyclone

Cyclonic Storm Rashmi
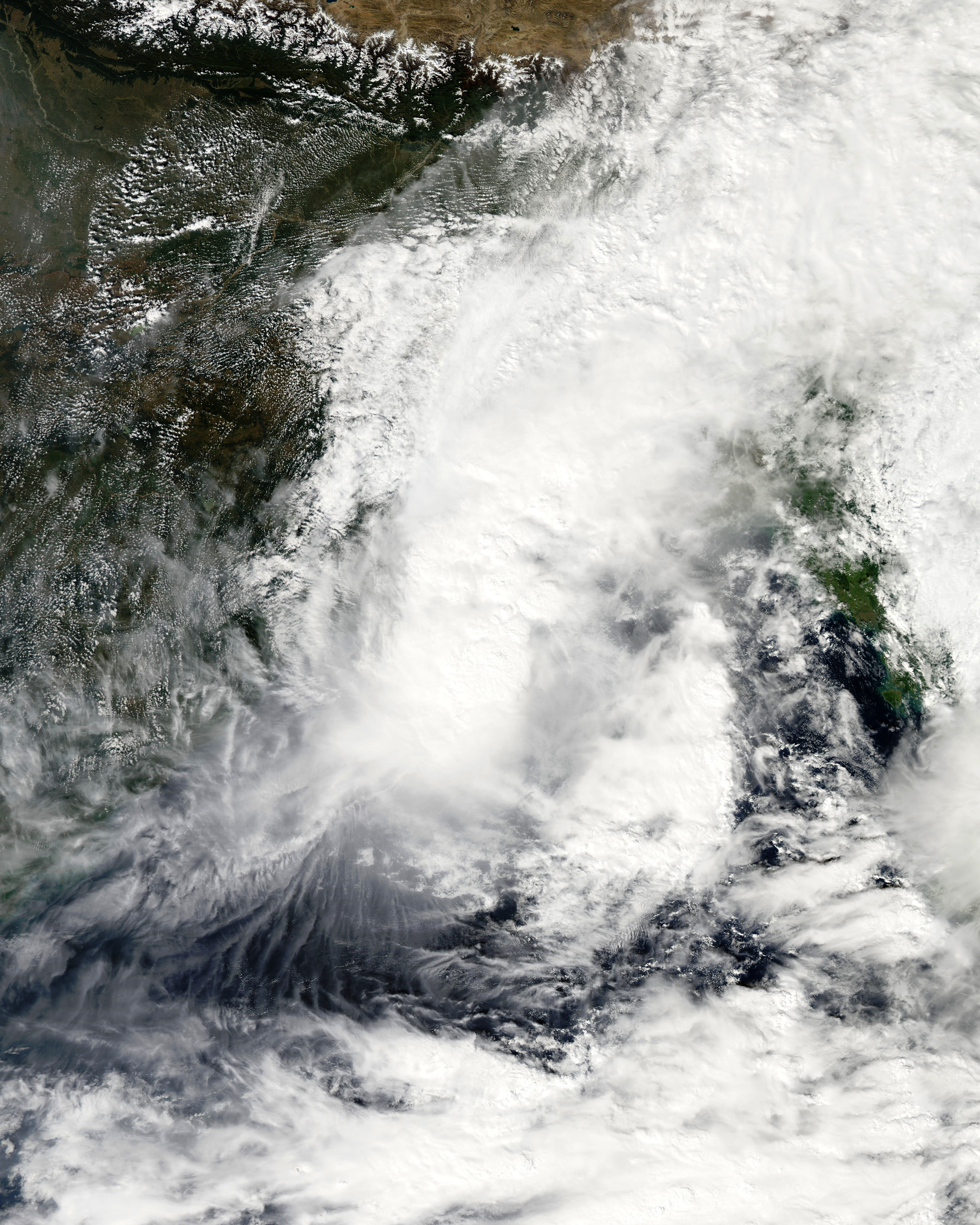
- Cyclonic Storm Rashmi approaching Bangladesh on 26 October

Meteorological history
- Formed: 25 October 2008
- Dissipated: 27 October 2008

Cyclonic storm
- 3-minute sustained (IMD)
- Highest winds: 85 km/h (50 mph)
- Lowest pressure: 984 hPa (mbar); 29.06 inHg

Tropical storm
- 1-minute sustained (SSHWS/JTWC)
- Highest winds: 85 km/h (50 mph)
- Lowest pressure: 989 hPa (mbar); 29.21 inHg

Overall effects
- Fatalities: 28 reported, 50 missing
- Areas affected: Bangladesh, India
- IBTrACS
- Part of the 2008 North Indian Ocean cyclone season

Cyclonic Storm Rashmi (Note: The name Rashmi (Sinhala: රශ්මි, [raʃmi]) was contributed by Sri Lanka and means "ray of light" in Sinhala.) (IMD designation: BOB 05, JTWC designation: 04B) was the seventh tropical cyclone of the 2008 North Indian Ocean cyclone season and second cyclonic storm, as well as the fifth tropical cyclone in the Bay of Bengal that year. A fairly weak tropical cyclone, it caused some notable damage and over two dozen fatalities in Bangladesh and India.

An area of low pressure formed within the Bay of Bengal on 24 October. It was designated as Depression BOB 05 the next day by the India Meteorological Department. The depression was declared a deep depression early on 26 October, whilst the Joint Typhoon Warning Center designated the depression as Cyclone 04B later that day with wind speeds equivalent to a tropical storm. Later that day, the IMD upgraded the deep depression into a cyclonic storm and named it as Rashmi. Rashmi then reached both its peak one- and three-minute sustained wind speeds, as it made landfall on the Bangladesh coast late on 26 October. Early the next day the JTWC issued its final advisory on Rashmi as the IMD downgraded Rashmi to a deep depression. Later that day the IMD, having noted that Rashmi had weakened rapidly, downgraded the deep depression to a well marked area of low pressure and released their final advisory.

The name Rashmi was submitted by Sri Lanka, to the World Meteorological Organisation's Tropical Cyclone Committee.

== Meteorological history ==
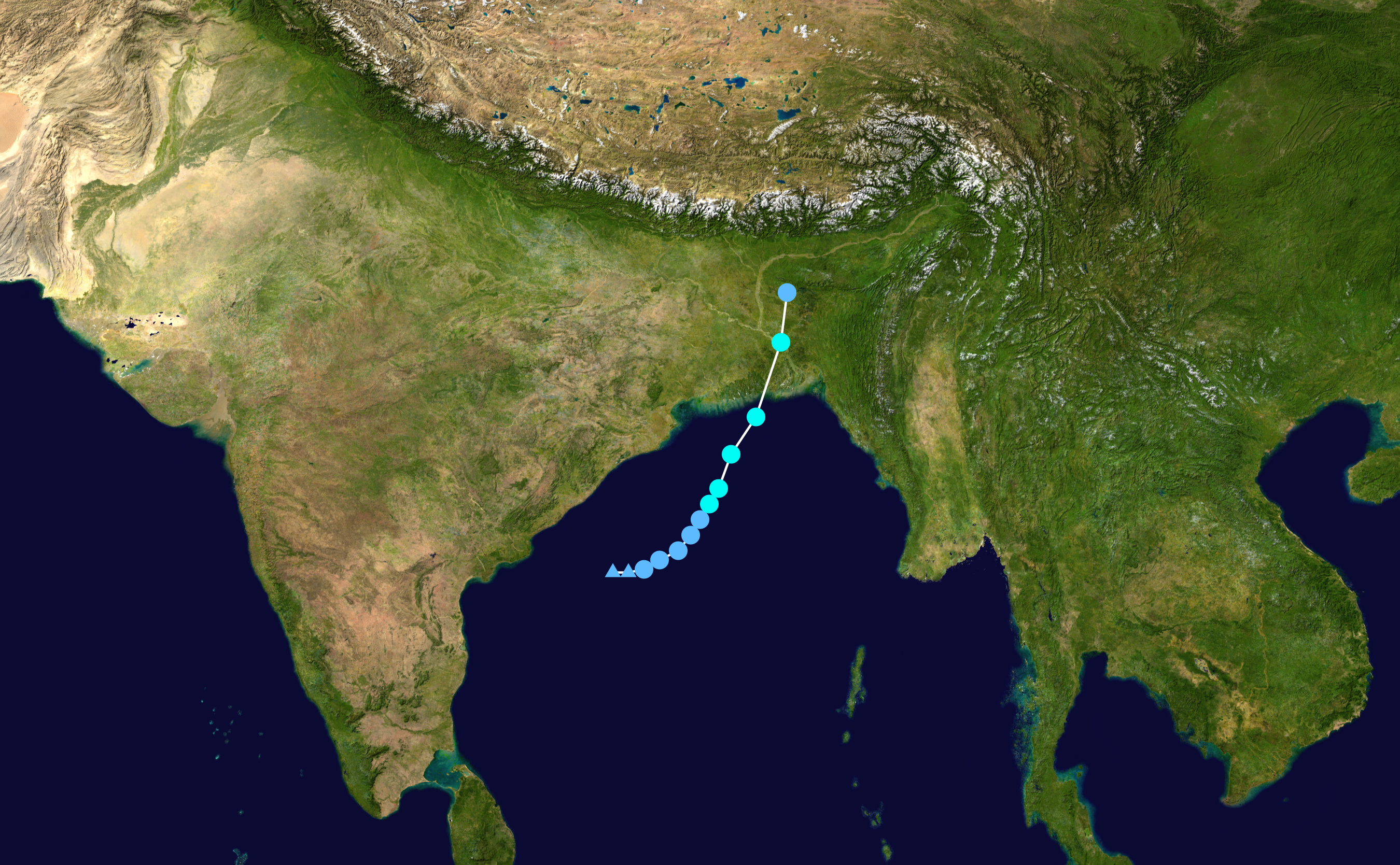
Map plotting the storm's track and intensity, according to the Saffir–Simpson scale Map key Saffir–Simpson scale Tropical depression (≤38 mph, ≤62 km/h) Tropical storm (39–73 mph, 63–118 km/h) Category 1 (74–95 mph, 119–153 km/h) Category 2 (96–110 mph, 154–177 km/h) Category 3 (111–129 mph, 178–208 km/h) Category 4 (130–156 mph, 209–251 km/h) Category 5 (≥157 mph, ≥252 km/h) Unknown Storm type Tropical cyclone Subtropical cyclone Extratropical cyclone, remnant low, tropical disturbance, or monsoon depression

On 24 October 2008, an area of low pressure formed in the North Indian Ocean, within the central Bay of Bengal. Later that day the Joint Typhoon Warning Center, designated it as a Tropical Disturbance and assessed its chances of forming into a significant tropical cyclone within the next 24 hours as fair. The next day as the India Meteorological Department reported that the disturbance had intensified into a depression and assigned the number BOB 05 to the depression. The JTWC then upgraded the depression's chances of forming into a significant cyclone to Good and issued a Tropical Cyclone Formation Alert on the depression.

Early on 26 October the IMD upgraded the depression to a deep depression, with wind speeds of 30 knots (35 mph; 56 km/h). At the same time the JTWC designated the depression as Cyclone 04B. Later that day the IMD reported that the Deep Depression had intensified into a Cyclonic Storm with it being named as Rashmi. During that evening the IMD reported that Rashmi had reached its peak 3 minute wind speeds of 40 knots, whilst the JTWC also reported that Rashmi had reached its peak 1 minute wind speeds of 45 knots.

Early the next day the IMD reported that Rashmi had made landfall on the Bangladesh coast, near Barisal. As a result of making landfall Rashmi started to weaken rapidly by becoming a Deep Depression, early that morning before being downgraded to a well marked area of low pressure, later during the morning.

== Preparations and impact ==
=== India ===
Five people were killed as incessant rains accompanied by winds hit the state of Meghalaya, India. The cyclone's incessant rainfall accompanied by gusty winds had caused flash floods in three districts of Assam - Kamrup, Sonitput and inundated vast tracts of land besides rendering people homeless. The flash floods occurred as neighbouring Bhutan and Arunachal Pradesh released excess waters from their reservoirs due to increased water levels caused by incessant rains for the last two days by cyclone Rashmi

=== Bangladesh ===
The Disaster Management Information Centre in Bangladesh issued cyclone warnings for various ports in Bangladesh including the Port of Mongla. As a result of these cyclone warnings, harbour activities were suspended for two days.

15 people were killed and thousands of homes were also damaged. Rashmi brought down electrical and telephone poles and uprooted trees; large areas of acres of crops were also destroyed. At least 50 fishermen were reported missing when about 15 fishing trawlers capsized offshore.

== See also ==
- Timeline of the 2008 North Indian Ocean cyclone season
