= Rashmi Sinha (epidemiologist) =

- Education: University of Stirling; University of Maryland, College Park
- Scientific career
- Fields: Nutritional and cancer epidemiology
- Workplaces: National Cancer Institute

Rashmi Sinha is a nutritional and cancer epidemiologist who researches diets, cancer risk, and the microbiome. She is a senior investigator in the metabolic epidemiology branch of the National Cancer Institute.

== Life ==
Sinha received a B.S. with honors and M.Sc. in biochemistry from the University of Stirling. She earned a Ph.D. in nutritional sciences from the University of Maryland, College Park. Her 1986 dissertation was titled, Age, nutrition, and bone metabolism: analyses of effects using a short-term in vivo bone model. She began work at the National Cancer Institute (NCI) in the laboratory of cellular carcinogenesis and tumor promotion in 1987. She was selected as a cancer prevention research fellow in 1990, and later joined the NCI division of cancer epidemiology and genetics (DCEG) in 1992.

Sinha was one of the founding members of the steering committee of the Molecular Epidemiology Group of the American Association for Cancer Research from 1997 to 1998, and of the Nutritional Epidemiology Research Group of the American Society of Nutritional Sciences from 1998 to 2000. Sinha was promoted to senior investigator in 2001 and co-principal investigator of the National Institutes of Health-AARP Diet and Health Study. She served for many years as deputy chief of the nutritional epidemiology branch. She is a senior investigator in the metabolic epidemiology branch. Sinha conducts interdisciplinary research to elucidate the dietary exposures and biological mechanisms associated with cancer risk, including the role of the microbiome.
