= 2008–09 Southern Hemisphere tropical cyclone season =

The 2008–09 Southern Hemisphere tropical cyclone season is made up of three different basins and respective seasons; the

- 2008–09 South-West Indian Ocean cyclone season west of 90°E,
- 2008–09 Australian region cyclone season between 90°E and 160°E, and
- 2008–09 South Pacific cyclone season east of 160°E.
