= Cyclone Fanele =

South-West Indian cyclone in 2009

Intense Tropical Cyclone Fanele
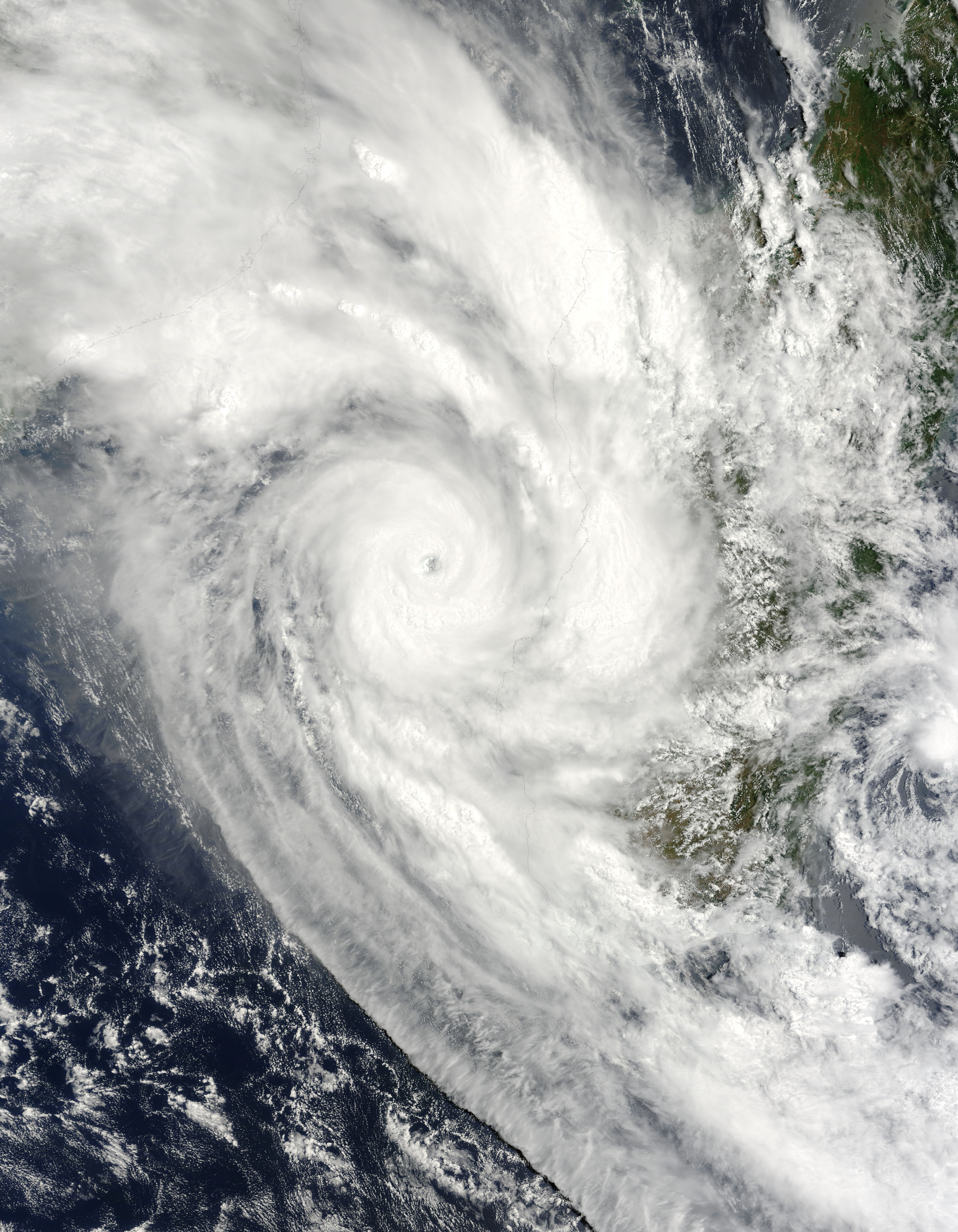
- Cyclone Fanele near peak intensity

Meteorological history
- Formed: January 18, 2009
- Dissipated: January 23, 2009

Intense tropical cyclone
- 10-minute sustained (MFR)
- Highest winds: 185 km/h (115 mph)
- Highest gusts: 260 km/h (160 mph)
- Lowest pressure: 930 hPa (mbar); 27.46 inHg

Category 4-equivalent tropical cyclone
- 1-minute sustained (SSHWS/JTWC)
- Highest winds: 215 km/h (130 mph)
- Lowest pressure: 937 hPa (mbar); 27.67 inHg

Overall effects
- Fatalities: 10 direct
- Areas affected: Madagascar
- IBTrACS
- Part of the 2008–09 South-West Indian Ocean cyclone season

Intense Tropical Cyclone Fanele was the first tropical cyclone to strike western Madagascar since Cyclone Fame one year prior. It formed on January 18, 2009 in the Mozambique Channel, and rapidly organized as it remained nearly stationary. Fanele ultimately turned toward the southwest Madagascar coastline, reaching peak winds of 185 km/h (115 mph), according to the Réunion Météo-France office (MFR). It weakened before moving ashore in Menabe Region southwest of Morondava, and rapidly weakened over land. Fanele briefly re-intensified after reaching open waters, only to become an extratropical cyclone by January 23.

The cyclone caused heavy damage near where it moved ashore and along its path, resulting in ten deaths. Fanele struck Madagascar just two days after Tropical Storm Eric brushed the northeastern portion of the country. The two storms affected over 50,000 people, of which at least 4,000 were left homeless. Fanele struck the country during a series of government protests, and consequentially relief efforts were hindered.

== Meteorological history ==
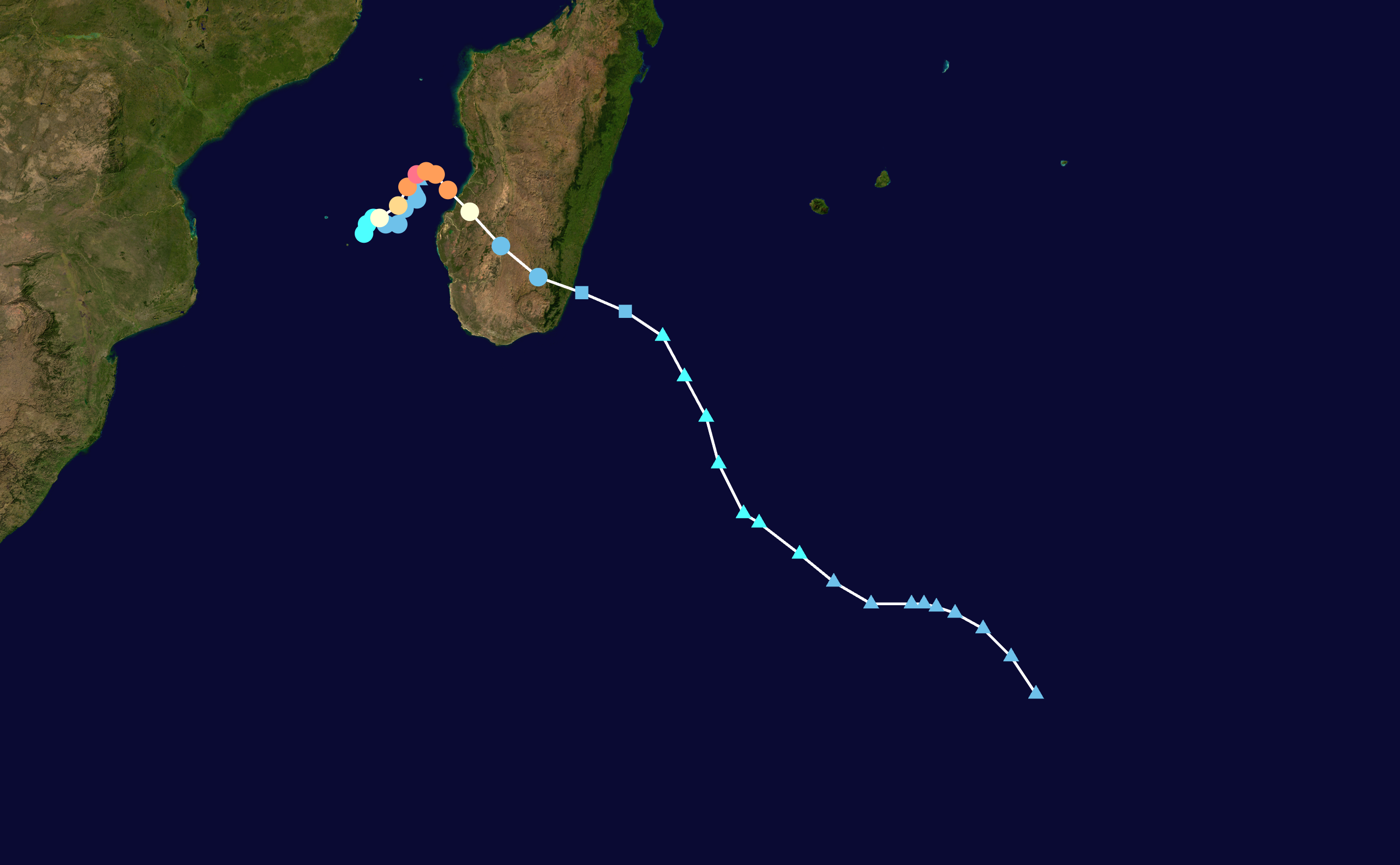
Map plotting the storm's track and intensity, according to the Saffir–Simpson scale Map key Saffir–Simpson scale Tropical depression (≤38 mph, ≤62 km/h) Tropical storm (39–73 mph, 63–118 km/h) Category 1 (74–95 mph, 119–153 km/h) Category 2 (96–110 mph, 154–177 km/h) Category 3 (111–129 mph, 178–208 km/h) Category 4 (130–156 mph, 209–251 km/h) Category 5 (≥157 mph, ≥252 km/h) Unknown Storm type Tropical cyclone Subtropical cyclone Extratropical cyclone, remnant low, tropical disturbance, or monsoon depression

For several days in the middle of January 2009, a very weak low-level circulation persisted in the Mozambique Channel, accompanied by intermittent and disorganized convection, or thunderstorms. By January 17, an area of convection persisted about 510 kilometres (320 mi) west-southwest of Antananarivo, Madagascar. Early on January 18; the circulation rapidly consolidated and organized while the thunderstorms developed into tightly curved rainbands. Environmental conditions favored further development; an anticyclone formed over the disturbance, an approaching trough provided favorable outflow, and the system benefited from both light wind shear and warm water temperatures. At 0600 UTC on the 18th, the Réunion Météo-France office (MFR) initiated advisories on Tropical Disturbance 07, noting its intensification as it drifted southwestward.

Six hours after being declared a tropical disturbance, MFR upgraded it to tropical depression status, and the agency predicted the system would eventually reach peak winds of 130 km/h (81 mph) before moving ashore. Its track was expected to follow that of another tropical cyclone east of Madagascar, which would become Tropical Storm Eric. Late on January 18, the system briefly became disorganized, only to re-organize and attain tropical storm status on January 19; upon doing so, the Malagasy Weather Service named it Fanele. Around the same time, the Joint Typhoon Warning Center (JTWC) began issuing advisories on the storm. The agency noted uncertainty in the future track of the storm, due to interaction with Tropical Storm Eric east of Madagascar, and Fanele was located within an area of weak steering currents. Tropical Storm Fanele quickly strengthened, developing an eye feature, and late on January 19 the JTWC estimated sustained winds of 120 km/h (75 mph); the agency predicted further strengthening to peak winds of 140 km/h (87 mph). Around that time, Fanele began rapid deepening under very favorable environmental conditions, and the MFR upgraded the storm to tropical cyclone status with winds of 150 km/h (93 mph). Upon attaining tropical cyclone status, the MFR forecast Fanele would intensify further to peak winds of 185 km/h (115 mph).

Early on January 20, Cyclone Fanele began a northeast motion, tracking along the eastern periphery of a ridge located over Mozambique. Later it turned southeastward under the influence of another ridge further to the east. The thunderstorms organized further around the eye, and at 1200 UTC on January 20 the MFR estimated Fanele attained peak winds of 185 km/h (115 mph) about 180 km (110 mi) west-northwest of Morondava along the Madagascar coast. At the same time, its atmospheric pressure was estimated at 927 hPa (mbar), and peak wind gusts were estimated at 261 km/h (162 mph). The JTWC also assessed peak winds of 185 km/h (115 mph). As it approached the coast, the cyclone became slightly less organized, with weaker convection and a less distinct eye; the weakening was due to an eyewall replacement cycle. At around 0215 UTC on January 21, Fanele made landfall on the western Madagascar coastline, to the southwest of Morondava.

Cyclone Fanele weakened quickly over land; within four hours of moving ashore, its winds decreased to 150 km/h (93 mph), and its wind field expanded. The eye feature dissipated as the system weakened to tropical storm status, and increased wind shear contributed to further weakening. By January 22, the poorly defined circulation moved over open waters, by which time its winds weakened to about 45 km/h (28 mph). Upon reaching the ocean, convection began to reform near the circulation, and Fanele re-attained tropical storm status. Cooler waters caused convection diminish near the center, which began the process of extratropical transition. Late on January 22, the JTWC issued its last advisory on the storm. By January 23, Fanele completed the transition into an extratropical storm as it accelerated toward the south-southeast. It persisted as a distinct tropical cyclone until later that day.

== Impact ==
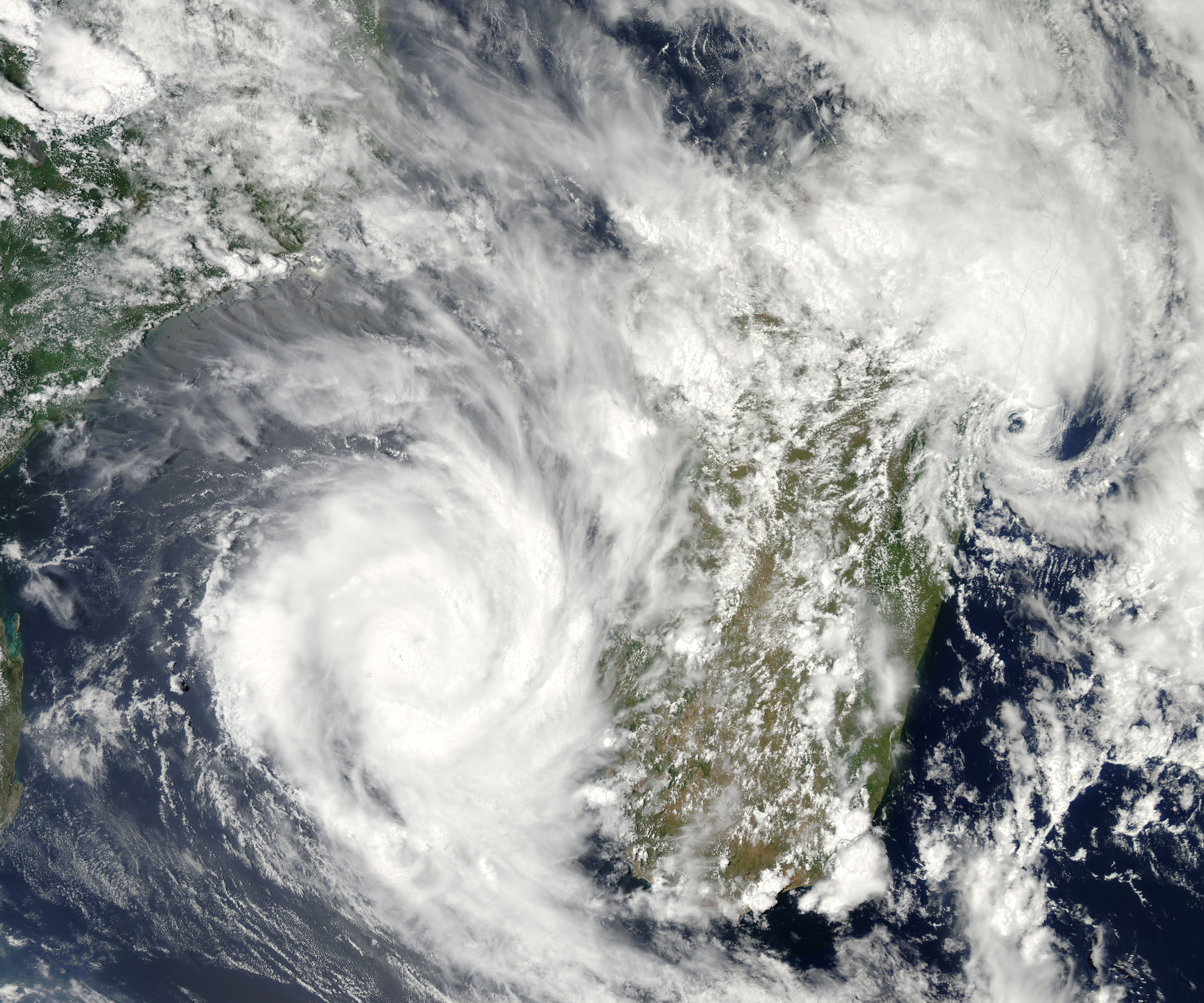
Cyclone Fanele and Moderate Tropical Storm Eric near Madagascar on January 19

Though the cyclone developed quickly, authorities were prepared for the storm; earlier in the year, Madagascar's National Office for Natural Disasters Preparedness implemented a plan for localized storm warning. Officials deployed warnings via radio to citizens in the path of Fanele, as well as to fishermen who were told to avoid leaving port.

Cyclone Fanele made landfall on western Madagascar in Menabe Region, where it destroyed many buildings, flooded large areas, and left thousands of people isolated. In the city of Morondava near the landfall location, the cyclone flooded 80% of buildings and damaged about half of the houses, leaving 3,000 people homeless. Throughout the region, the winds damaged 158 classrooms attended by 9,000 children. Further inland, the cyclone damaged bridges and roads, leaving some areas isolated. The outer rainbands of the storm produced heavy rainfall in the northwest portion of the country, resulting in flooding that left about 250 people homeless in Sofia Region. The passages of Cyclones Eric and Fanele affected 54,802 people, leaving 4,102 without shelter. At least 28,000 people were affected directly by Fanele, and the cyclone killed a total of ten people. The cyclone disrupted work to rebuild areas that were affected by Cyclone Ivan in February 2008.

Cyclone Fanele struck the country during a series of government protests, and consequently the national government provided little response to the storm. Instead, United Nations (UN) agencies quickly provided relief to affected citizens. The World Food Programme prepared 87 metric tons (MT) of cereal and 13 MT of various types of pulses. Five United Nations Children's Fund (UNICEF) trucks arrived in Morondova on January 25 with various supplies. In the days after the storm, contaminated floodwaters resulted in cases of dysentery. To prevent the spread of disease, UNICEF provided vaccines, de-worming tablets, and water cleaning devices. Within three days of the storm's landfall, the agency also began distributing health kits and bed nets. As many schools were affected, UNICEF set up temporary classrooms in tents, while workers began fixing and cleaning the damaged buildings. Despite the quick response by the UN, thousands of people were left without aid. The Malagasy Red Cross deployed its volunteers to affected areas, although disrupted transportation services and the political situation hindered relief efforts.

== See also ==
- Geography of Madagascar
- 2009 Malagasy protests
