= 2008–09 South-West Indian Ocean cyclone season =

Cyclone season in the Southwest Indian Ocean

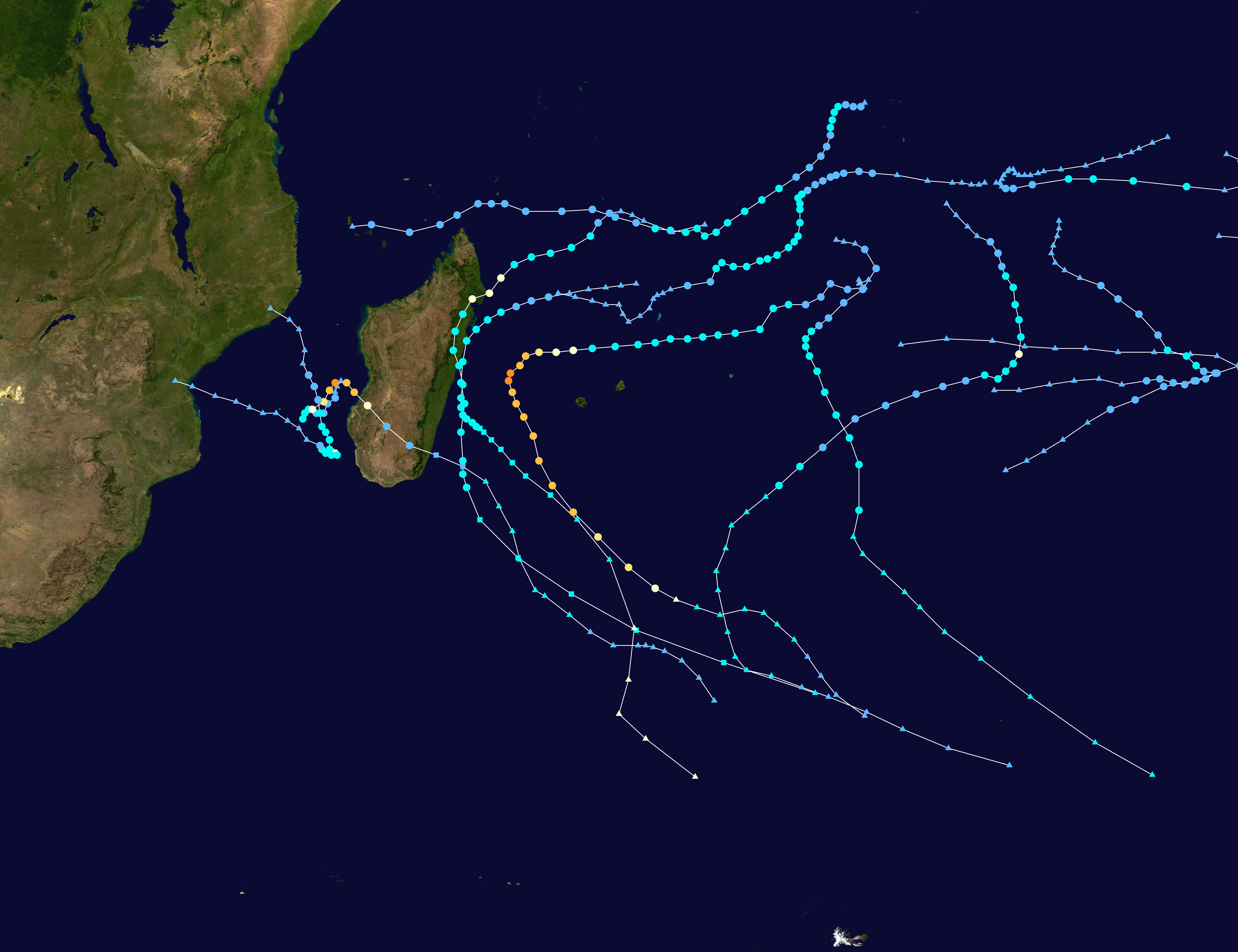
- Season summary map

Seasonal boundaries
- First system formed: October 6, 2008
- Last system dissipated: April 10, 2009

Strongest storm
- Name: Fanele & Gael
  - Maximum winds: 185 km/h (115 mph) (10-minute sustained)
  - Lowest pressure: 930 hPa (mbar)

Seasonal statistics
- Total disturbances: 12
- Total depressions: 10
- Total storms: 10
- Tropical cyclones: 2
- Intense tropical cyclones: 2
- Total fatalities: 30 total
- Total damage: Unknown

Related articles
- 2008–09 Australian region cyclone season; 2008–09 South Pacific cyclone season

The 2008–09 South-West Indian Ocean cyclone season was a slightly above average event in tropical cyclone formation. It began on November 15, 2008, and officially ended on April 30, 2009, with the exception for Mauritius and the Seychelles, for which it ended on May 15, 2009. These dates conventionally delimit the period of each year when most tropical cyclones form in the basin, which is west of 90°E and south of the Equator. Tropical cyclones in this basin were monitored by the Regional Specialised Meteorological Centre in Réunion.

As predicted by the sub regional office of Mauritius ten named storms formed in this basin. It officially began on November 15, but began 1 month earlier when Tropical Storm Asma formed on October 16. Most of the storms that formed this year were weak or stayed at sea. Only two storms reached hurricane strength this year, both of which were Category 3 or higher, and only 3 storms made landfall in the entire season. Overall, the impact of this season was relatively minor, but damaging for Madagascar, due to the heavy rains from Eric, Fanele, Izilda and Jade.

== Systems ==
=== Zone of Disturbed Weather 01 ===
- Zone of disturbed weather (MFR)
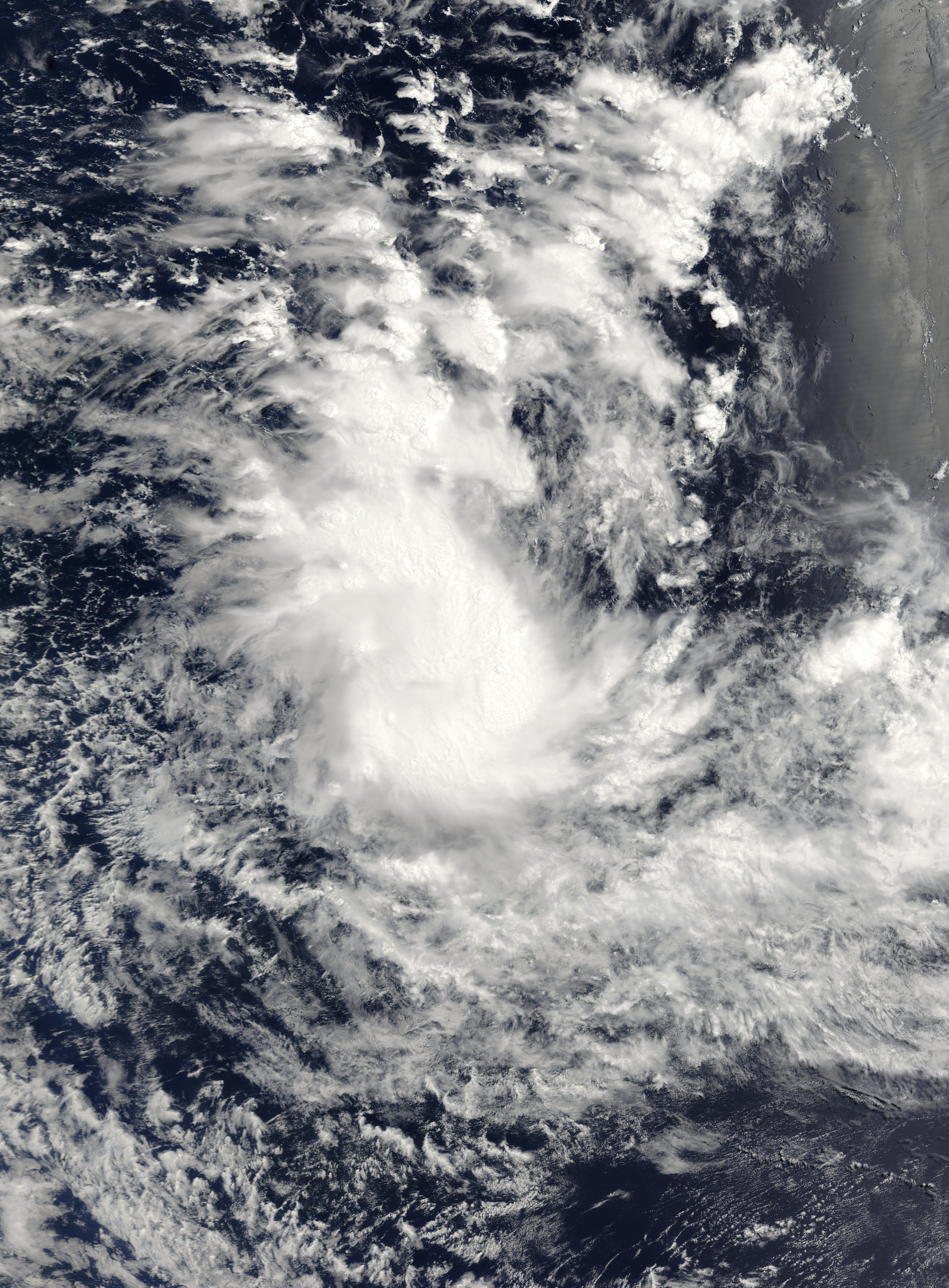
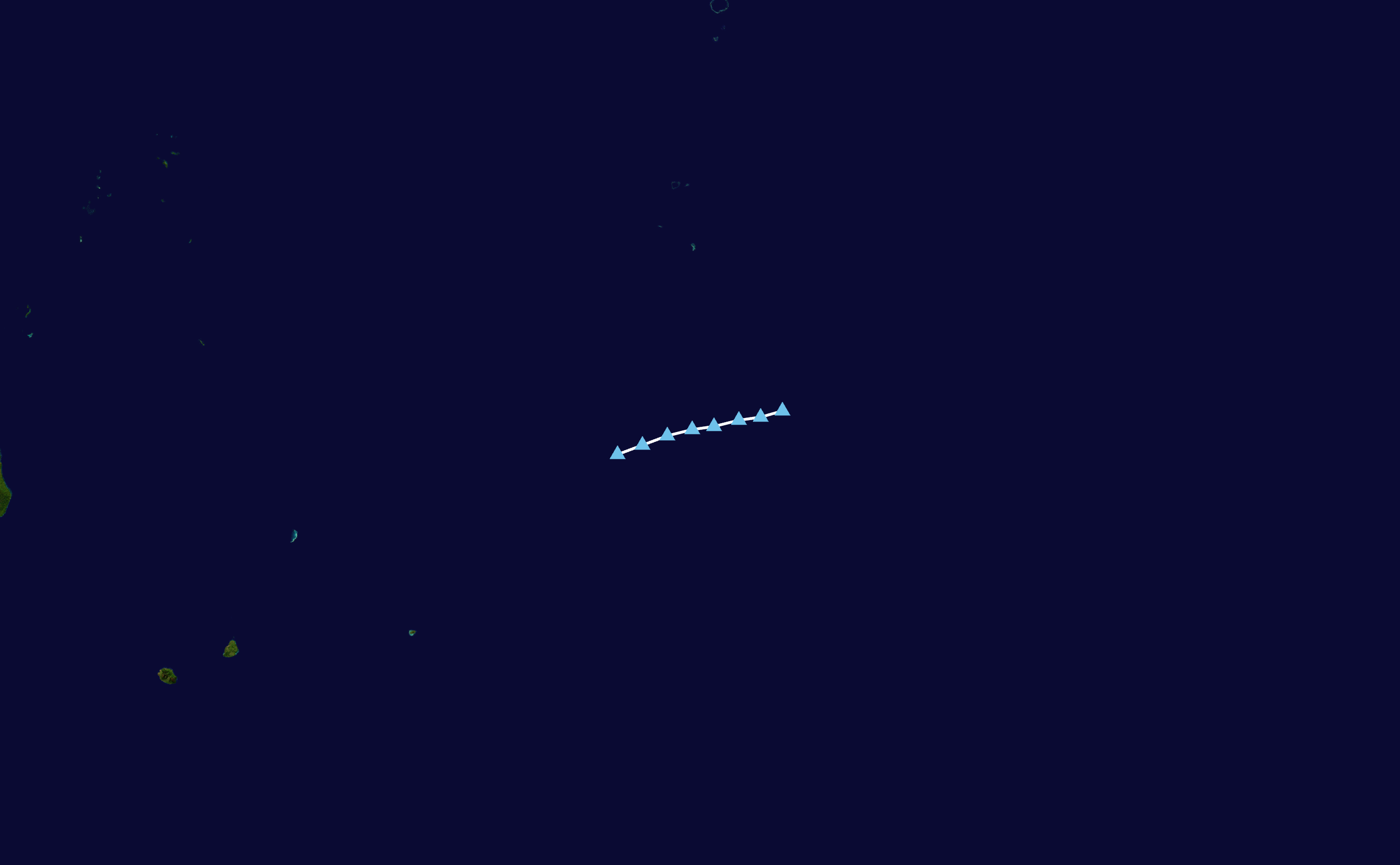
- Duration: October 6 – October 8
- Peak intensity: 35 km/h (25 mph) (10-min); 1006 hPa (mbar)

On October 6, the Joint Typhoon Warning Center (JTWC) began monitoring an area of persistent convection about 575 km (355 mi) southeast of Diego Garcia. Although the center of circulation (CoC) was elongated, the system was located within an area of low wind shear and development of the low was possible. At 12:00 UTC later that day, the Regional Specialized Meteorological Centre (RSMC), Météo-France (MFR), began issuing advisories on "Zone of Disturbed Weather 01". Despite a banding feature developed around the CoC, significant development was not anticipated. The low gradually weakened throughout October 7, and dissipated the next day.

=== Moderate Tropical Storm Asma ===
- Moderate tropical storm (MFR)
- Tropical storm (SSHWS)
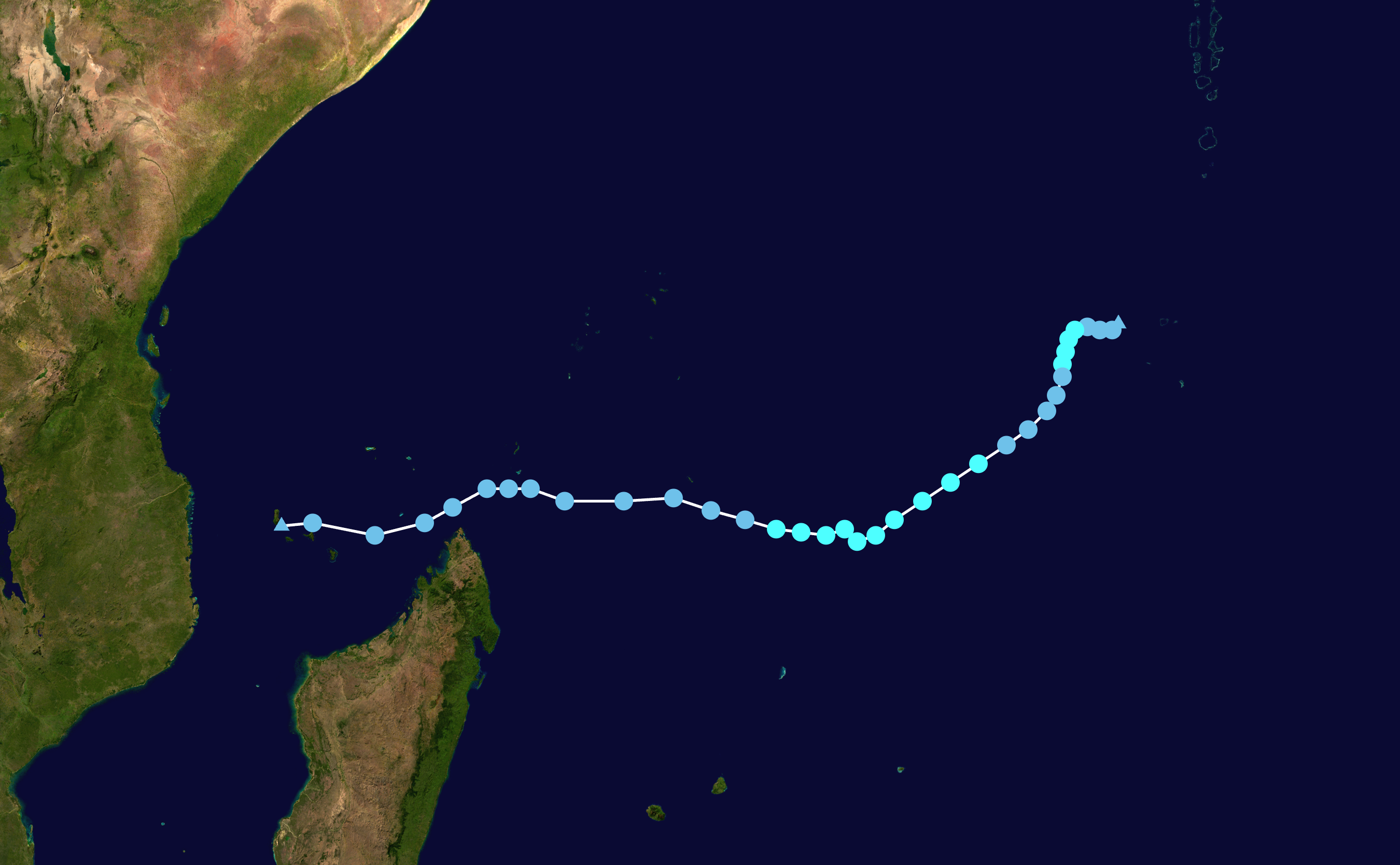
- Duration: October 15 – October 24
- Peak intensity: 85 km/h (50 mph) (10-min); 988 hPa (mbar)

On October 16, MFR designated an area of low pressure north-west of Diego Garcia as Tropical Disturbance 02. Later that evening the JTWC issued a Tropical Cyclone Formation Alert on the system. At 2100 UTC on October 16, the JTWC issued their first advisory and designated it as Tropical Cyclone 01S. Early the next day the disturbance intensified into a tropical depression, but on October 18 MFR downgraded the system to a tropical disturbance, noting that the near gale-force winds that were near the center are now several hundred kilometers away from the center. The next day MFR re-upgraded the system to a tropical depression due to a slight decrease in vertical wind shear that had inhibited the disturbance and a slight re-location of the center. Later that day MFR upgraded the depression to a Moderate Tropical storm, so the Sub-Regional Tropical Cyclone Advisory Centre in Mauritius assigned the name Asma to the tropical storm. Early on October 20, Asma reached its peak intensity with winds of 85 km/h (55 mph) with a minimum pressure of 985 hPa (mbar). The storm featured good outflow and was situated over warm waters; however, moderate wind shear was forecast to prevent the cyclone from intensifying any further. Shortly after reaching peak intensity, the combination of cooler waters and higher wind shear caused the storm to weaken slightly. Continued weakening took place throughout the day as deep convection associated with Asma dissipated and the strongest winds were displaced from the center. By the morning of October 21, Asma was downgraded to a tropical depression as the low became further disorganized. Later that day, the depression degenerated to a tropical disturbance as only an exposed low remained. The final advisory was issued at 0600 UTC on October 22 as no redevelopment took place. However, only 12 hours after the final advisory was issued, the disturbance began to regenerate and MFR began issuing advisories on the regenerated system. The redevelopment was short lived and Asma dissipated less than 24 hours later.

Officials in Madagascar issued storm warnings as Tropical Storm Asma was forecast to make landfall in the northern portion of the island on October 23. Despite warnings, residents did not take precautions before the storm. Following the regeneration of Asma, the storm produced heavy rains over northern Madagascar which caused flooding in eight rural communities. One person was killed in Doany common rural district of Andapa. A total of 448 hectares of farmland were also inundated by floodwaters. Six oxen and 24 pigs were also killed and three bridges were damaged. Following the damages caused by the storm, officials provided first aid kits, nine tons of rice, 100 cartons of soap, 60 cartons of clothing, 120 mosquito nets, 20 bags of pulses and 30 tents to the affected population. The heavy rains were accompanied by winds gusting up to 70 km/h (45 mph). After brushing Madagascar, Asma brought unseasonable heavy rains to parts of Mozambique and Tanzania.

=== Moderate Tropical Storm Bernard ===
- Moderate tropical storm (MFR)
- Tropical storm (SSHWS)
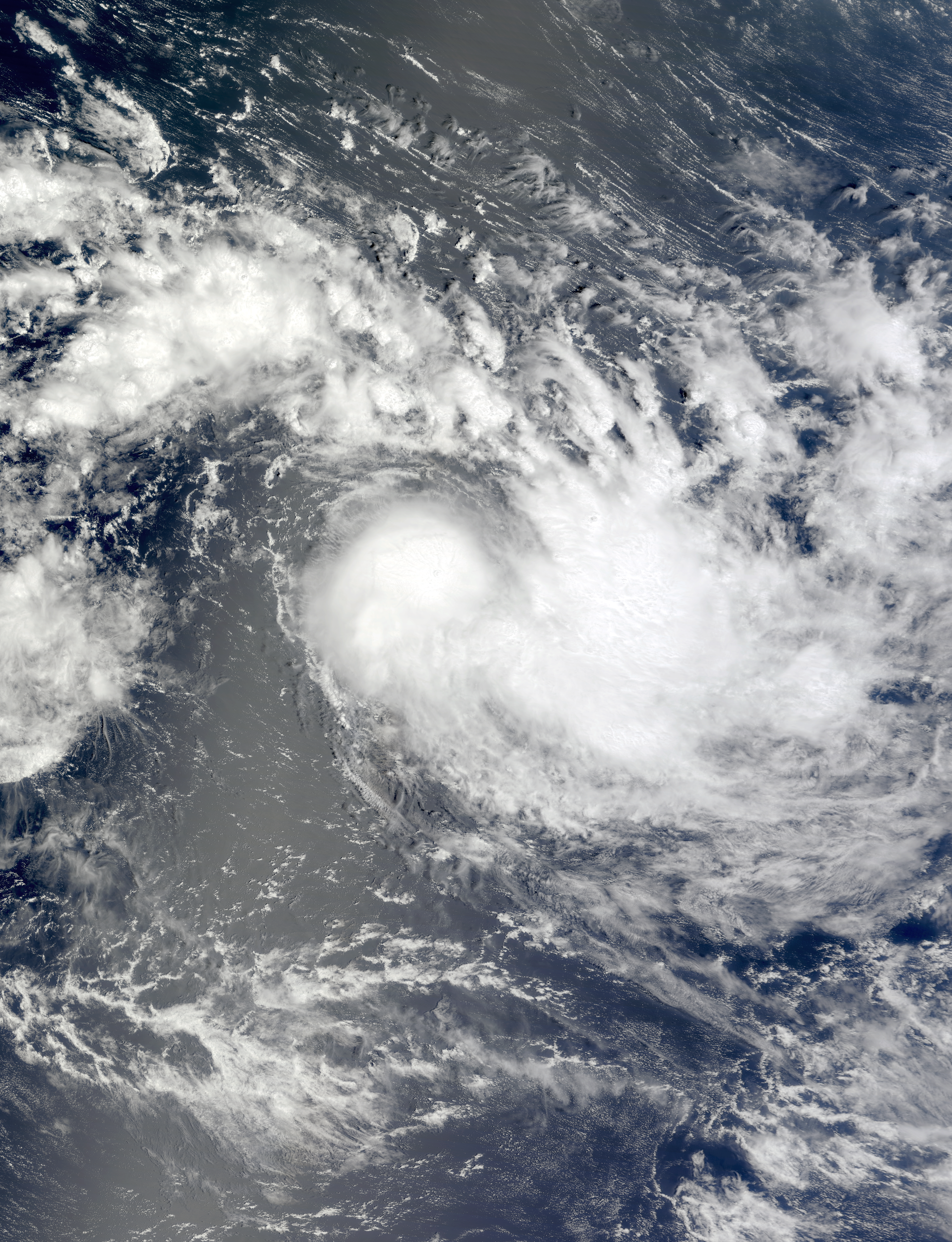
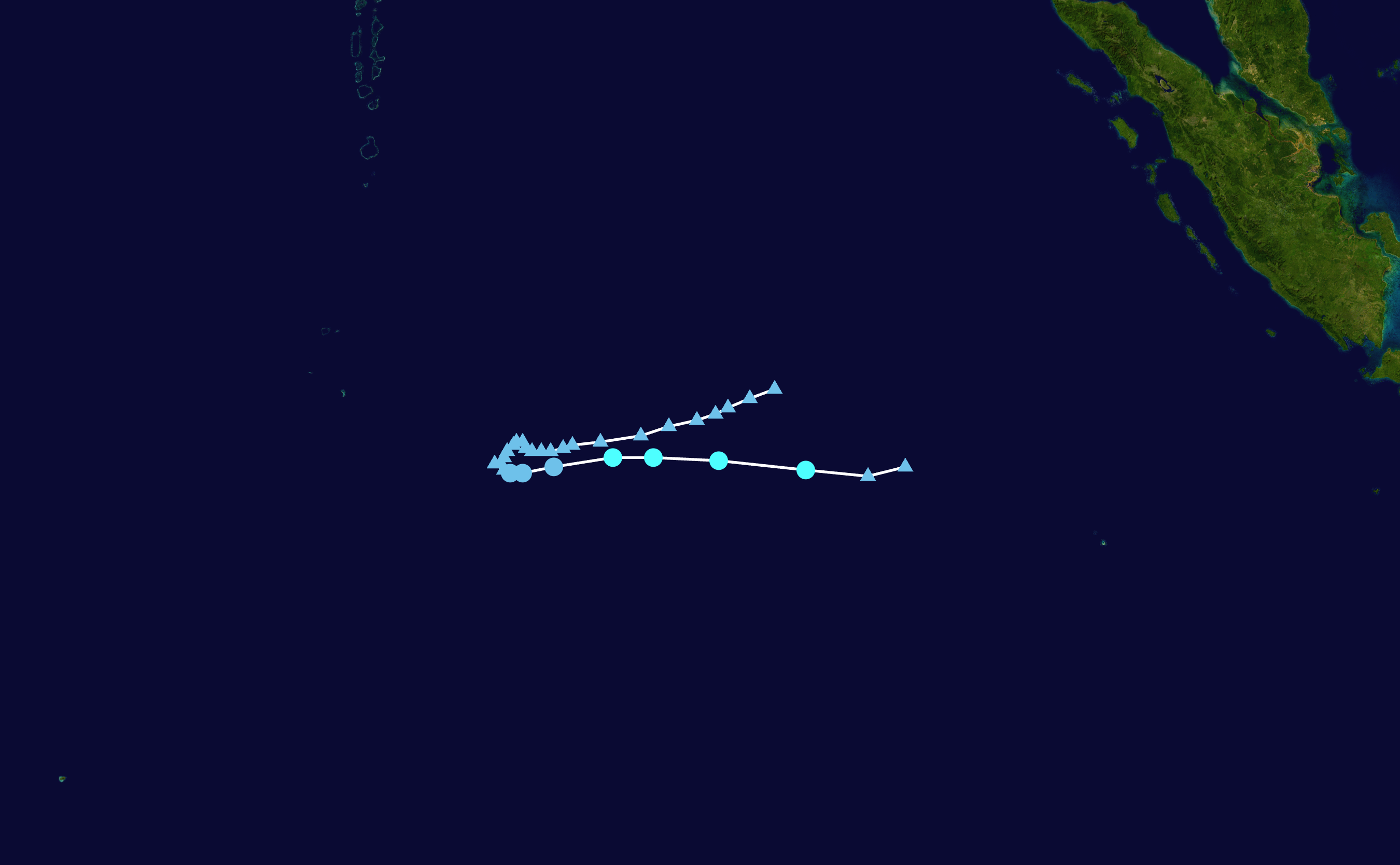
- Duration: November 13 – November 21
- Peak intensity: 65 km/h (40 mph) (10-min); 995 hPa (mbar)

On November 15, a low-pressure area was located about 795 km (495 mi) east-southeast of Diego Garcia, accompanied by persistent convection. It was centered east of a ridge and was within an area of moderate vertical wind shear. Over the next several days, the system moved slowly eastward with little development. On November 19, convection developed around the circulation after being nearly stationary for a few days. At 0600 UTC, MFR designated the system as Tropical Disturbance 03, about 695 km (430 mi) east-southeast of Diego Garcia. As rainbands and outflow developed, the JTWC issued a Tropical Cyclone Formation Alert. Later that day, MFR upgraded the disturbance to a tropical depression. About three hours later, the JTWC began issuing advisories on Tropical Cyclone 03S, although wind shear was forecast to prevent significant intensification. Located to the northeast of a low to mid-level trough and to the southwest of a near-equatorial ridge, the system began to accelerate to the east. At 0600 UTC on November 20, the JTWC assessed the system to have reached its peak intensity with winds of 75 km/h (45 mph 1-minute winds). Shortly after, MFR upgraded the depression to Moderate Tropical Storm Bernard, with peak winds of 65 km/h (40 mph).

Just six hours after being named, Bernard was downgraded to a tropical depression as all associated deep convection dissipated. The sudden decrease was caused by the storm's unusually fast movement of 50 km/h (30 mph) towards the east-southeast over cooler waters. At the same time MFR downgraded Bernard to a depression, the JTWC issued their final advisory on Tropical Cyclone 03S as it had weakened below tropical storm status. Early the next morning, MFR downgraded the system to a tropical disturbance and issued their final advisory on the dissipating cyclone. The remnants of Bernard entered the Australia region, where it was briefly designated as Tropical Low 01U before dissipating.

=== Severe Tropical Storm Cinda ===
- Severe tropical storm (MFR)
- Tropical storm (SSHWS)
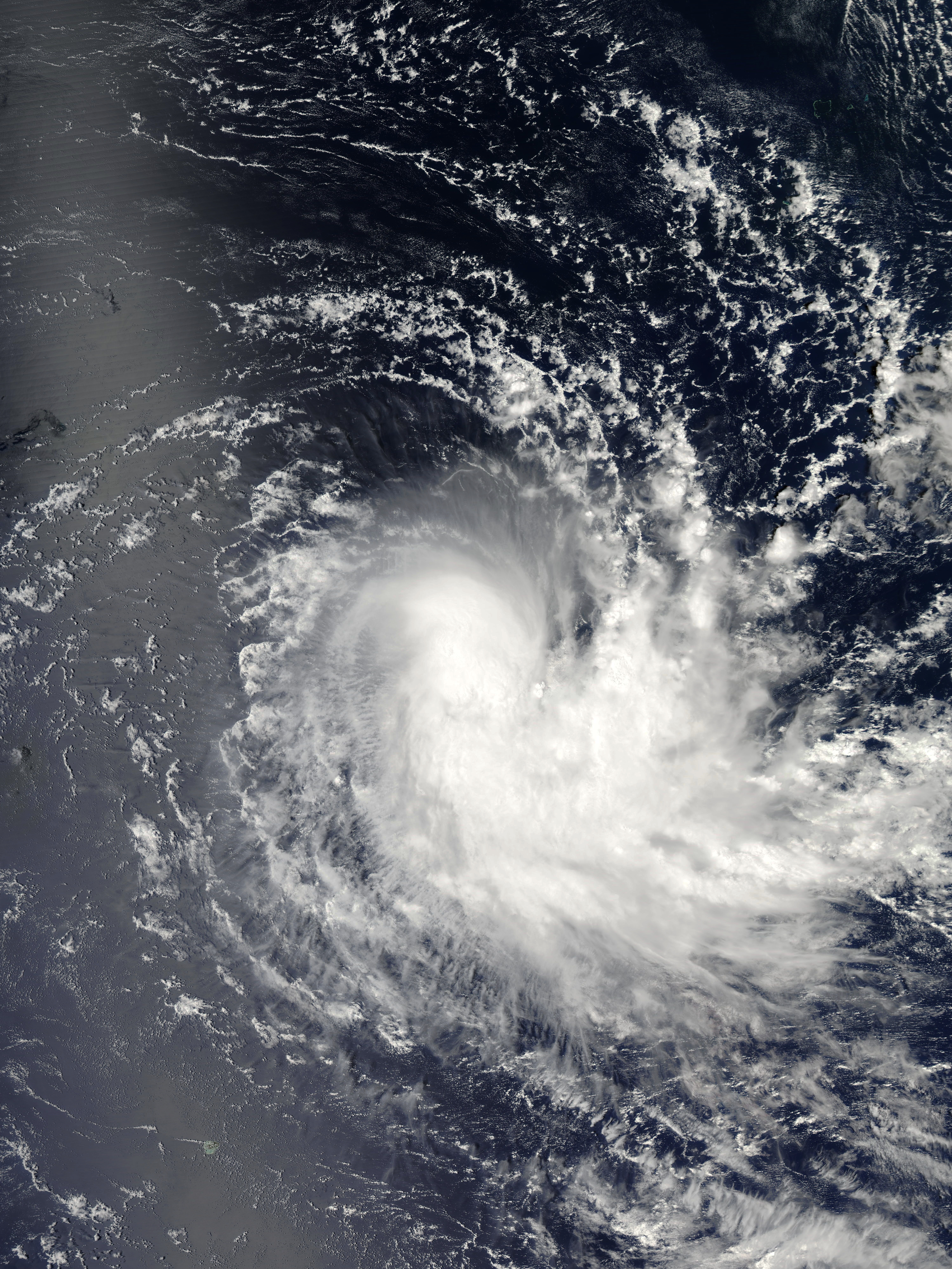
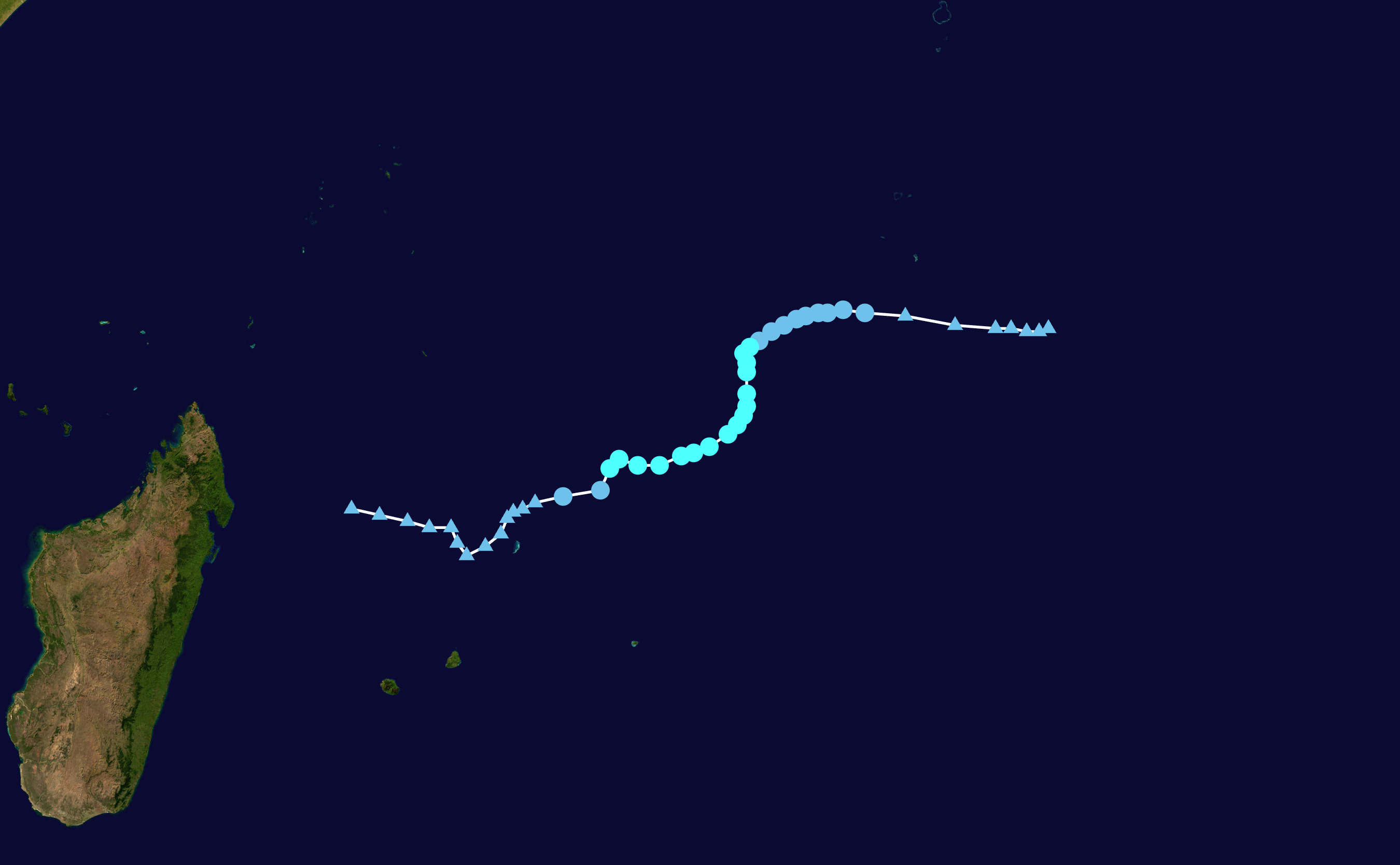
- Duration: December 13 – December 24
- Peak intensity: 95 km/h (60 mph) (10-min); 985 hPa (mbar)

On the evening of December 16, the JTWC issued a Tropical Cyclone Formation alert on a rapidly organizing disturbance located west of Diego Garcia. The low level centre continued to improve with convection wrapping into the centre and the JTWC upgraded the disturbance into a tropical storm, at the same time MFR designated the system a tropical depression. Under low shear and favourable upper-level outflow, 04S was upgraded to Moderate Tropical Storm Cinda by MFR early on December 18. Soon after, Cinda was upgraded to a severe tropical storm as it moved south-southwestwards away from Diego Garcia. Later that same day, Cinda was downgraded to a moderate tropical storm. The wind shear kept the eye north of the convection. On the morning of December 21, Cinda degenerated into a remnant low about 250 miles off the coast of Madagascar amongst heavy wind shear.

=== Severe Tropical Storm Dongo ===
- Severe tropical storm (MFR)
- Tropical storm (SSHWS)
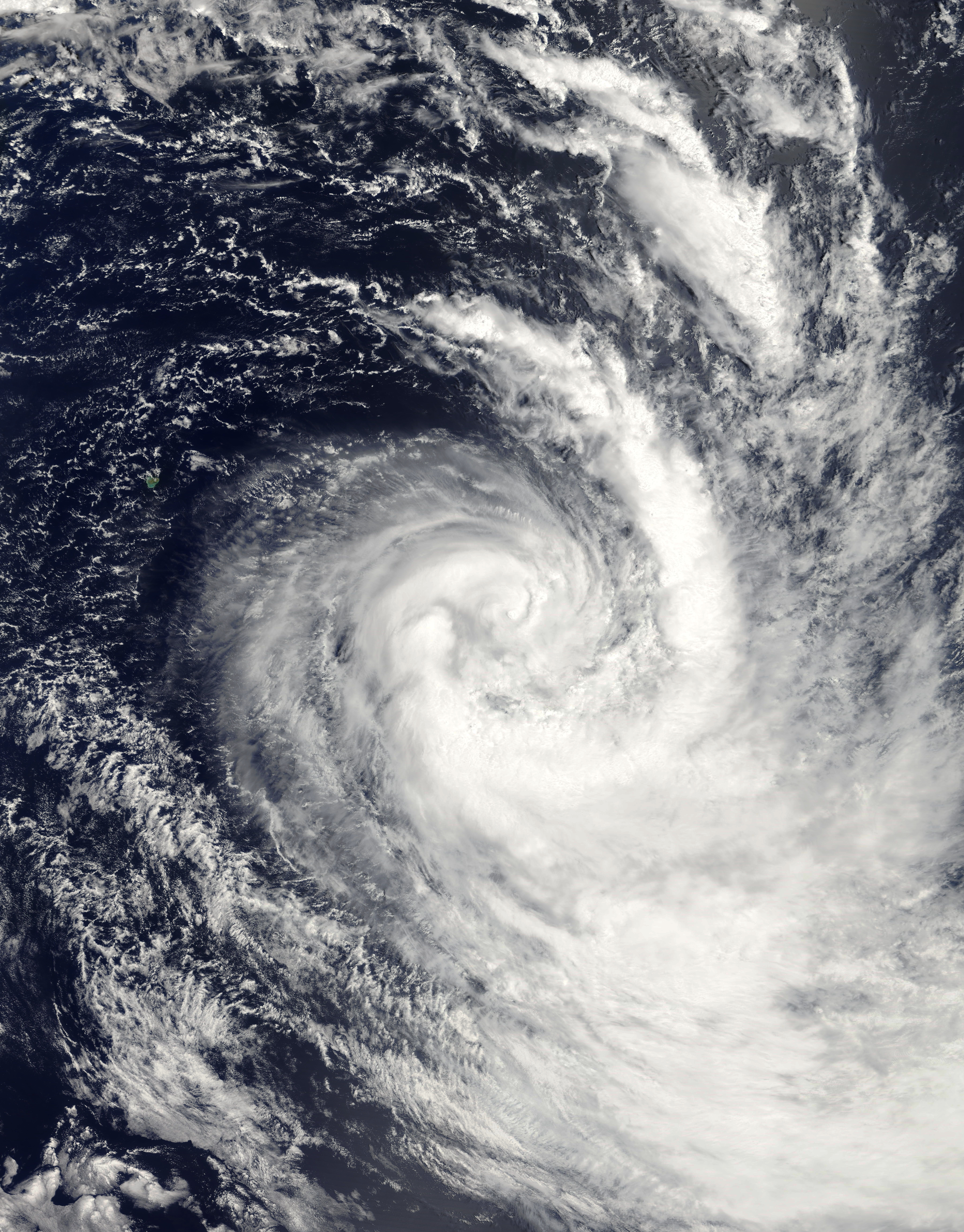
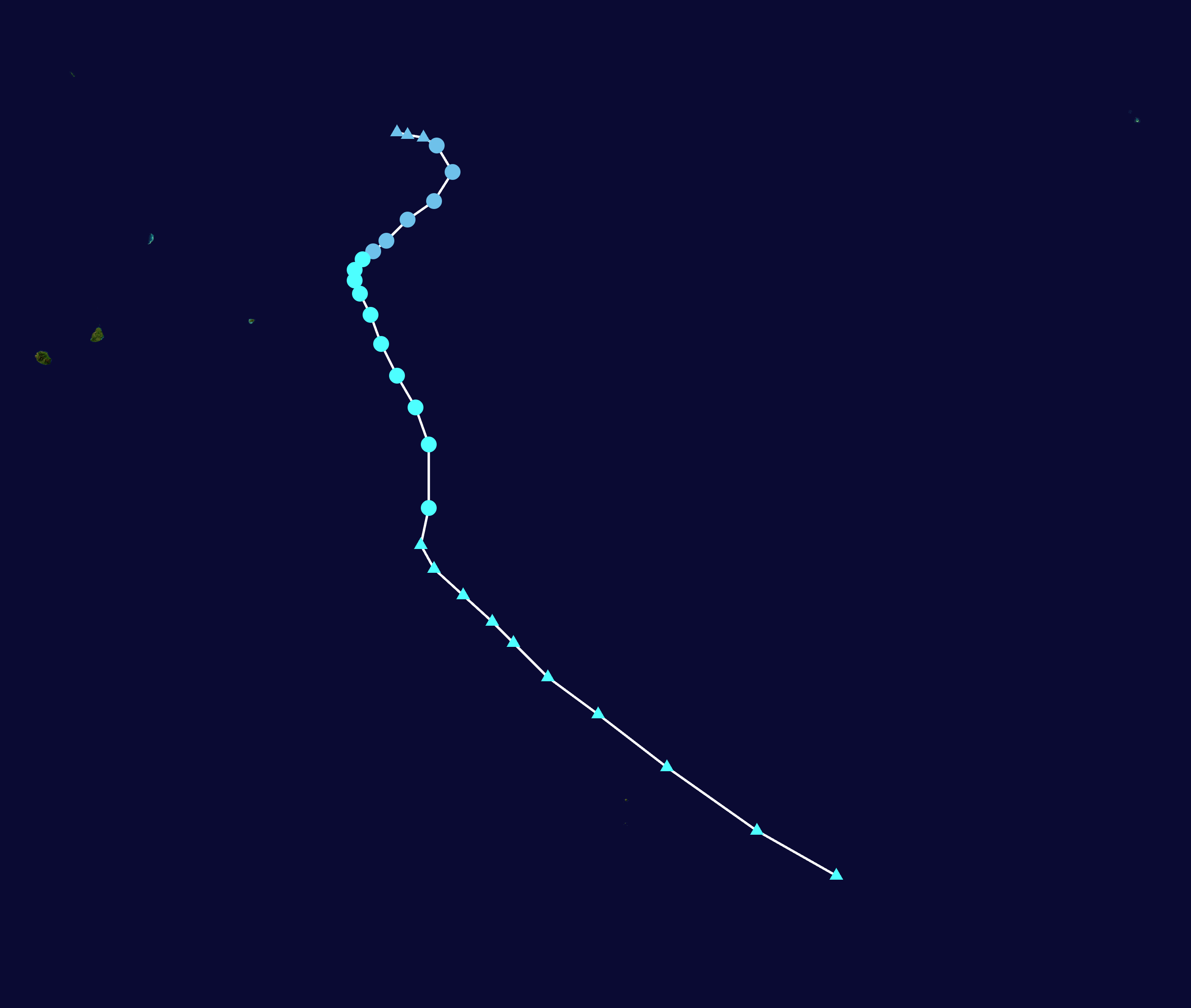
- Duration: January 7 – January 12
- Peak intensity: 95 km/h (60 mph) (10-min); 984 hPa (mbar)

The origins of Dongo can be traced back to an area of low pressure that formed far from land late on January 7. At 06:00 UTC, MFR designated it as a Zone of Disturbed Weather 1,530 km (950 mi) northeast of Mauritius. However, strong wind shear was expected to inhibit short-term development. A few hours later, MFR further upgraded the low to a tropical disturbance. At 1500 UTC, the JTWC issued a Tropical Cyclone Formation Alert. Situated along the edge of a low-mid level ridge, the disturbance tracked towards the southwest. Despite a brief decease in convection, at 0600 UTC on January 9, MFR upgraded the disturbance to a tropical depression. Shortly after, the depression was upgraded to Moderate Tropical Storm Dongo. At the time of the upgrade, Dongo began to turn more towards the south as further development of the storm was anticipated. Roughly three hours later, the JTWC began issuing advisories on Tropical Cyclone 06S . After weakening slightly early on January 10, Dongo began to turn towards the southeast. Subsequently, convection rapidly decreased, leaving the center partially exposed even though conditions were favorable for intensification. Six hours later, however, Dongo intensified into a severe tropical storm while reaching its peak intensity with winds of 95 km/h (60 mph 10-minute winds) with a minimum pressure of 984 hPa (mbar) according to MFR. Furthermore, Dongo peak with winds of 100 km/h (65 mph 1-minute winds) according to the JTWC about 1,240 km (770 mi) east-southeast of Mauritius.

Tracking towards the south-southeast, Dongo approached cooler waters and began to transition into an extratropical cyclone. Wind shear was also increasing over the storm in response to an approaching upper-level trough. Despite moving over cooler waters, the storm remained a severe tropical storm until being declared extratropical at 0600 UTC on January 12. Several hours later, the JTWC issued their final advisory on the system Early on January 13, MFR followed suit, though it was later believed to have completed such transition earlier.

=== Moderate Tropical Storm Eric ===
- Moderate tropical storm (MFR)
- Tropical storm (SSHWS)
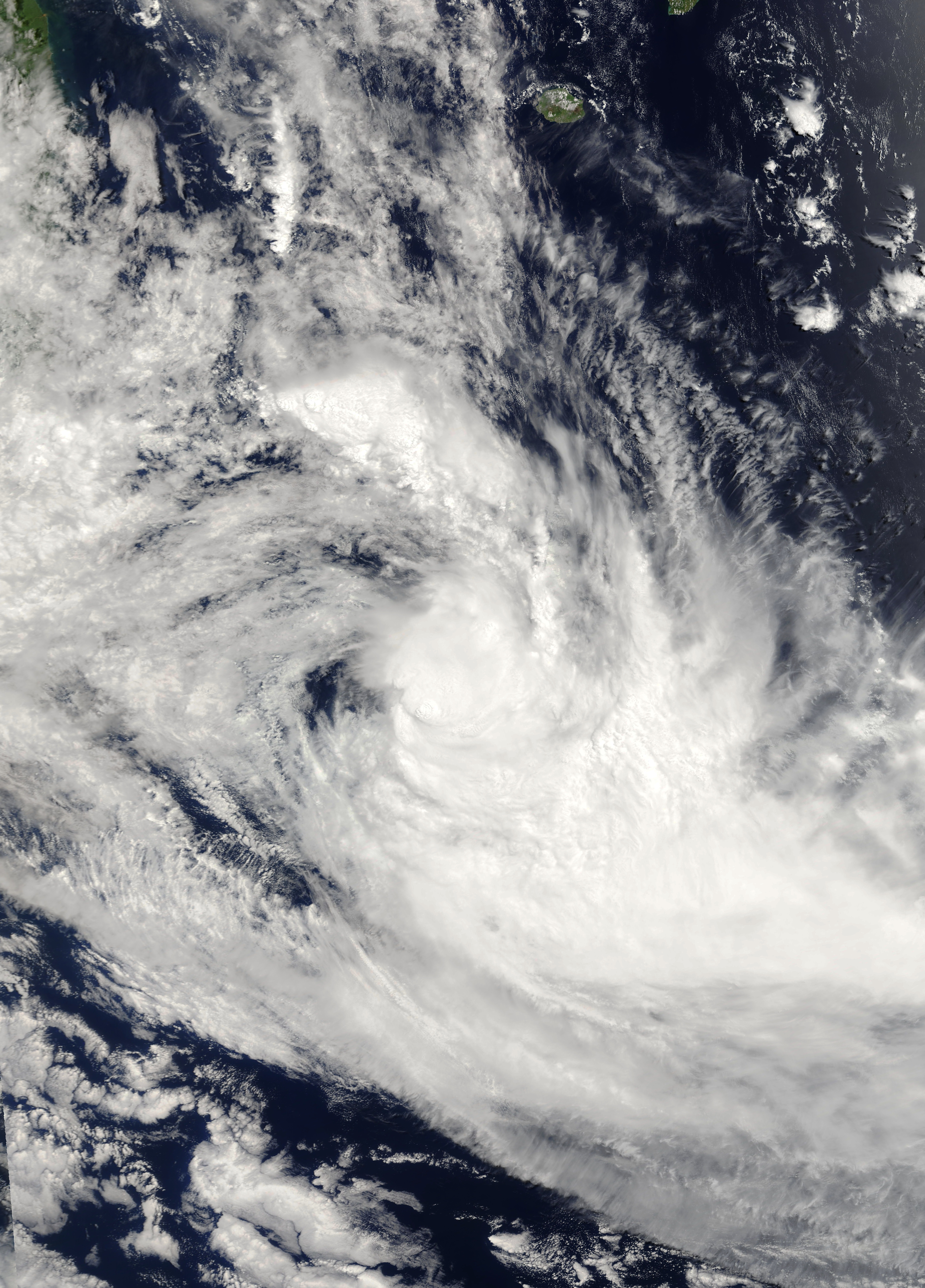
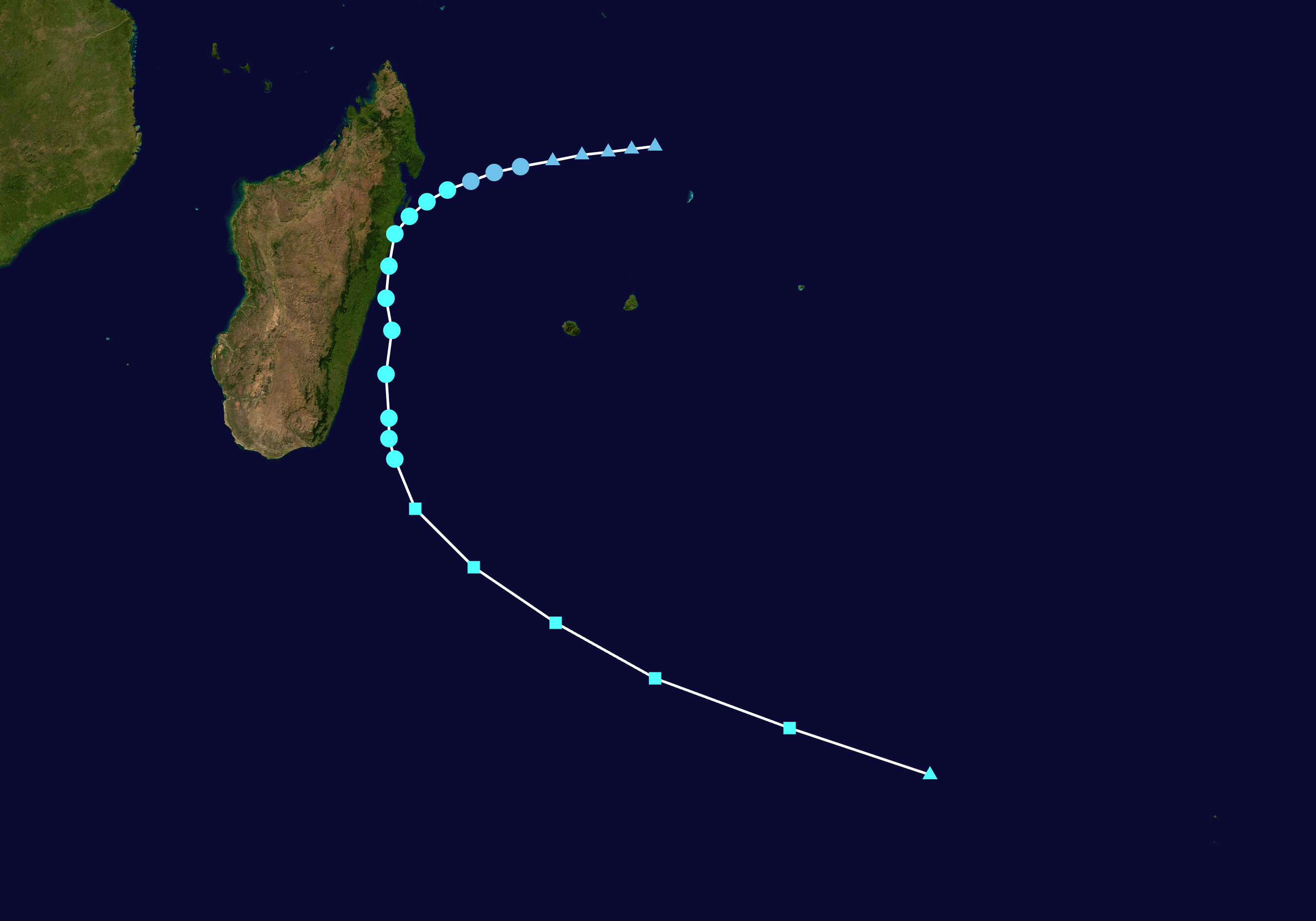
- Duration: January 16 – January 22
- Peak intensity: 85 km/h (50 mph) (10-min); 990 hPa (mbar)

On January 17, the MFR identified a Zone of Disturbed Weather northeast of La Réunion. The following day the disturbance organized quite significantly west-northwest of Madagascar and MFR classified it as a tropical disturbance. The disturbance intensified into a moderate tropical storm on the 19th. Eric crossed the coastline around Toamasina, which reported a surface low pressure of 992 hPa, mid morning on that day and skirted along the eastern Madagascar coast for much of the day before tracking southeast away from the coast on January 20. On January 20, the JTWC issued its final advisory on Eric, as it had been torn apart by the shear from the strong Fanele. MFR downgraded Eric to a tropical depression on January 21, noting it could re-deepen as it transitioned into an extratropical cyclone.

Eric killed two people, injured 24, left 992 homeless, and affected an additional 7,606 in eastern Madagascar. A total of 32 classrooms were destroyed by the storm, mainly UNICEF tents and 42 other classrooms were damaged.

=== Intense Tropical Cyclone Fanele ===
- Intense tropical cyclone (MFR)
- Category 4 tropical cyclone (SSHWS)
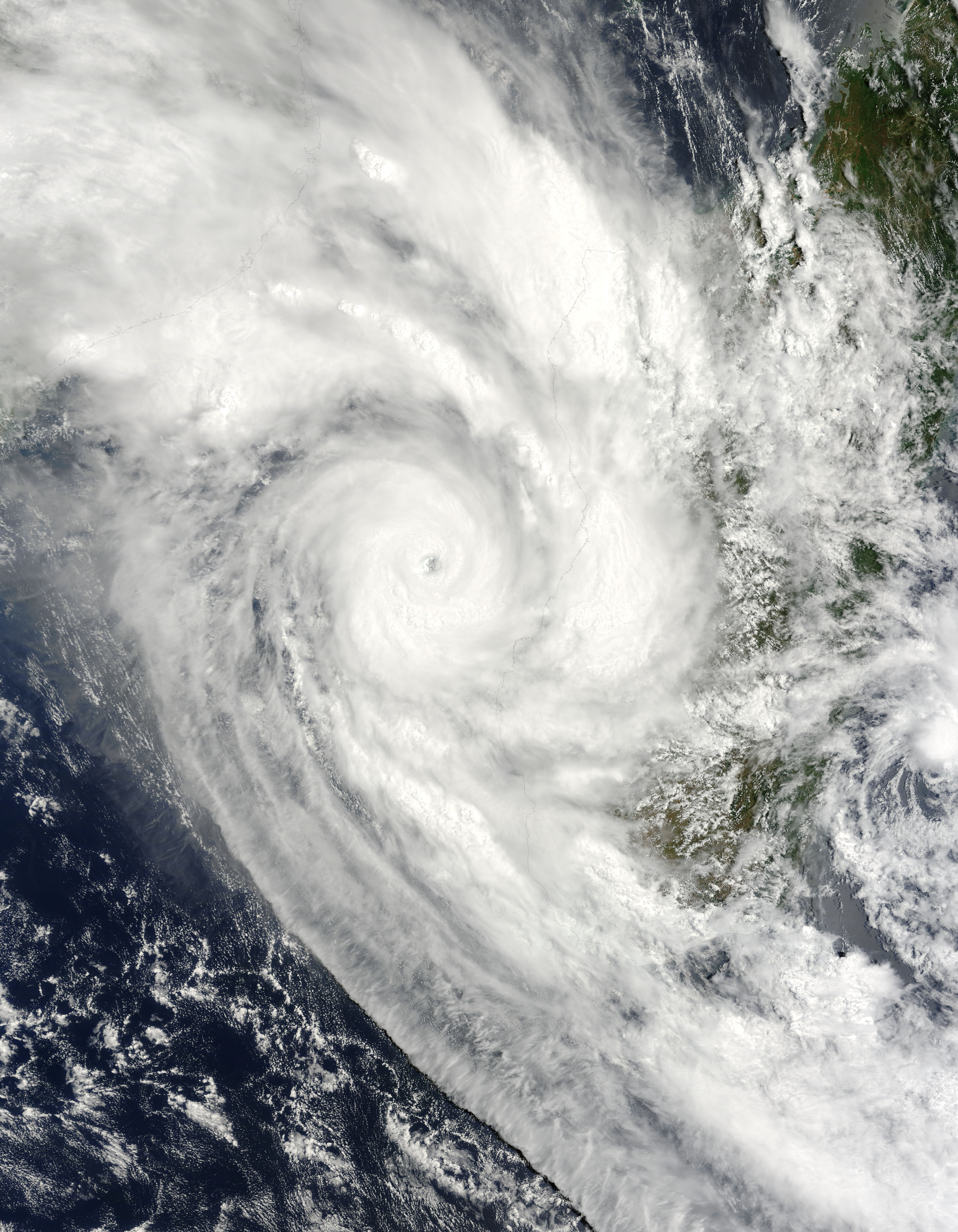
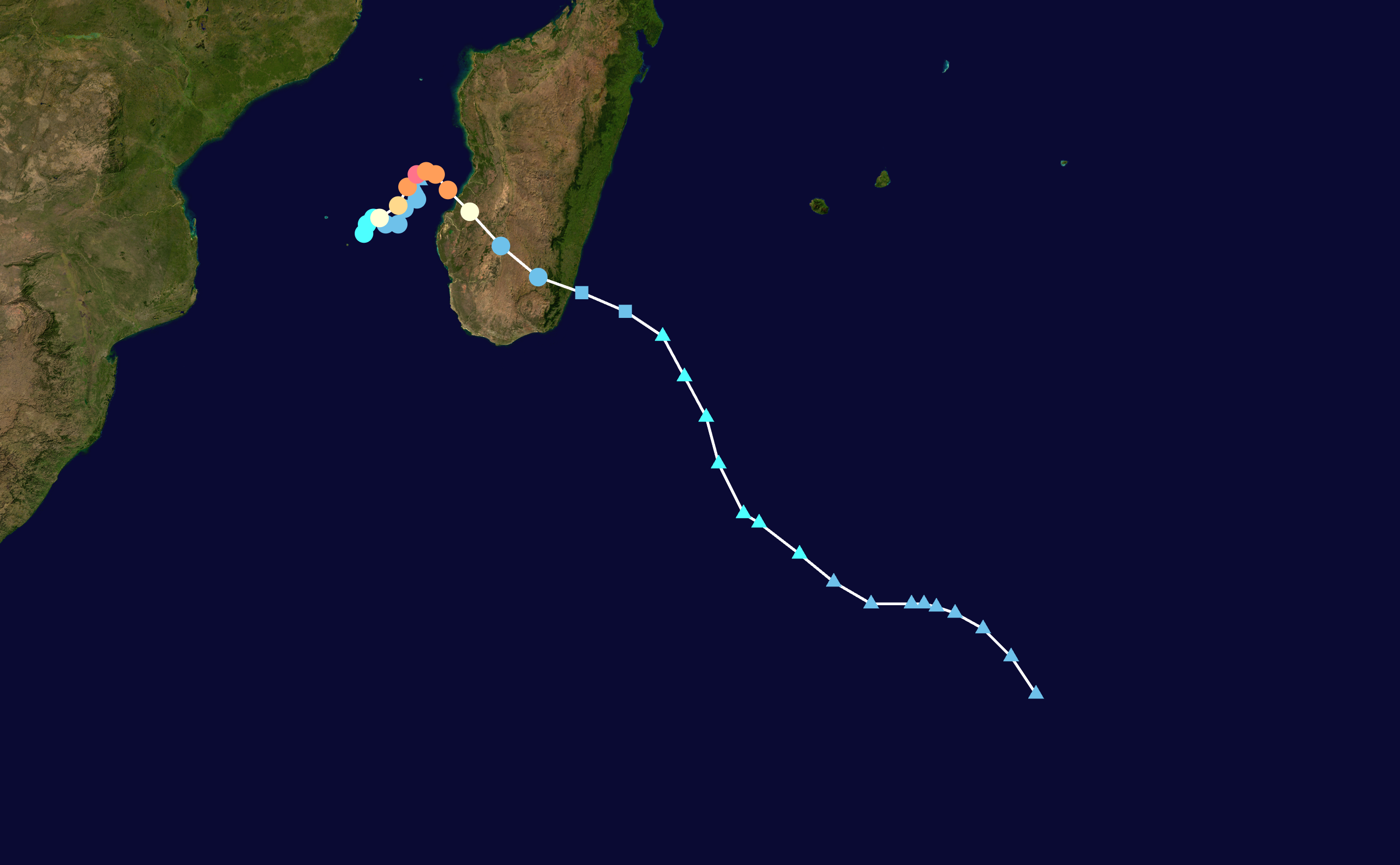
- Duration: January 17 – January 22
- Peak intensity: 185 km/h (115 mph) (10-min); 930 hPa (mbar)

On January 17, the JTWC identified a rapidly organizing tropical low just off the coast of Madagascar, near Antananarivo, in the Mozambique Channel. The system showed signs of a quickly developing surface low, and evidence of an upper-level Anticyclone creating a favorable environment for the system. Later that day, the JTWC assessed the possibility of the system becoming a tropical cyclone in 24 hours as Poor. As the system continued to organize, the JTWC issued a Tropical Cyclone Formation Alert early the next morning. Soon afterward, the MFR designated the system as Tropical Disturbance 07. The system was predicted to organize at regular speed and remain quasi-stationary within the next 24 hours and then recurve toward the Malagasy coast as a moderate tropical storm. Six hours later, MFR upgraded the system to Tropical Depression 07. The next day, the tropical depression was upgraded to Moderate Tropical Storm Fanele and the JTWC upgraded it to Tropical Cyclone 09S. Later that day, Fanele continued to rapidly organize as it strengthened into a Severe Tropical Storm. Late on January 19, Fanele strengthened into a high-end Tropical Cyclone. It strengthened into an Intense Tropical Cyclone on the morning of January 20 with an intensity of 100 knot winds. Fanele made landfall between 00:00 and 02:00 UTC on January 21 and weakened to a Category 1 with 75 knot winds. Early in the morning of January 22, Fanele weakened to tropical depression as it exited into the Indian Ocean. It strengthened back into a Moderate Tropical Storm, but it became extratropical the next day.

At least eight people were killed, two were left missing, and over 20,000 others were left homeless due to Fanele.

=== Intense Tropical Cyclone Gael ===
- Intense tropical cyclone (MFR)
- Category 4 tropical cyclone (SSHWS)
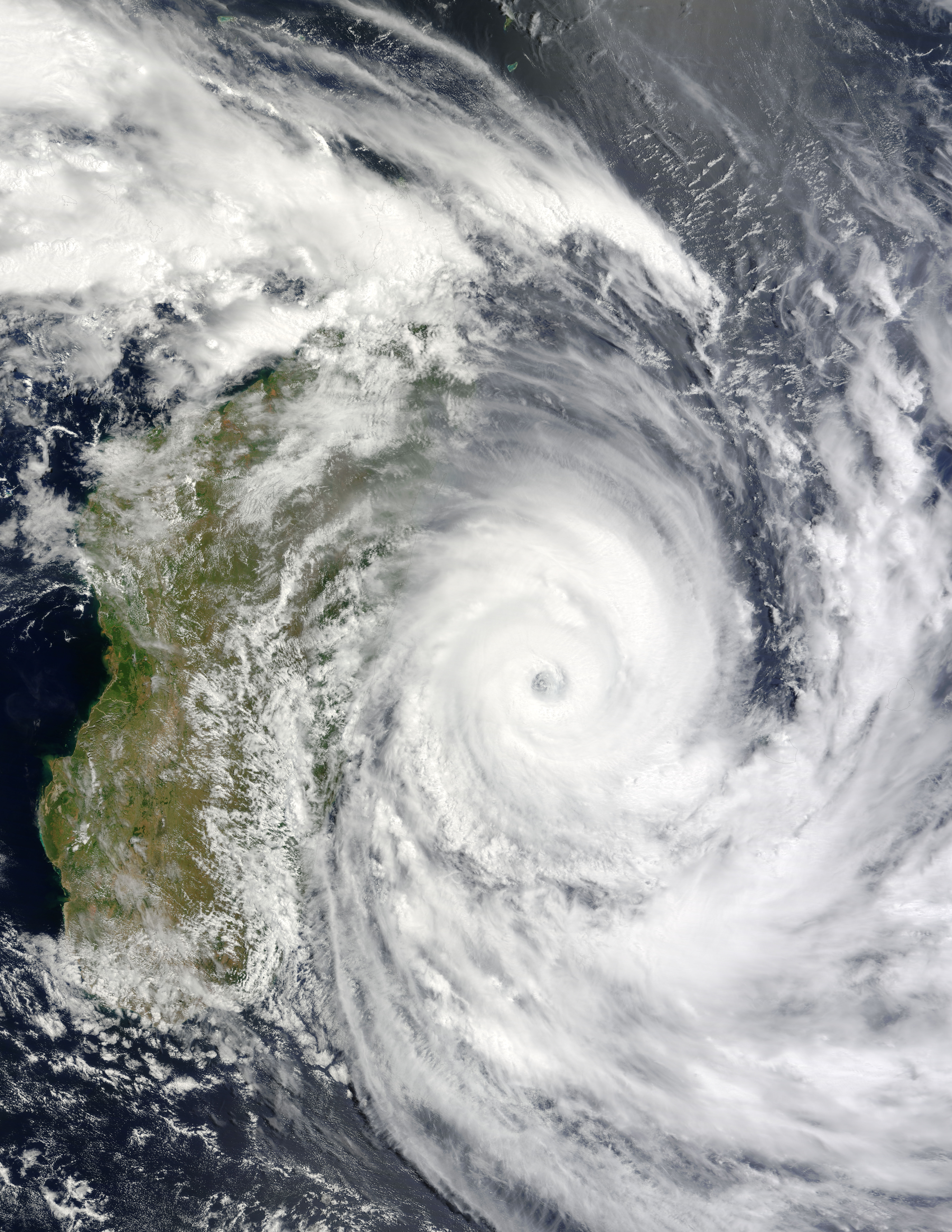
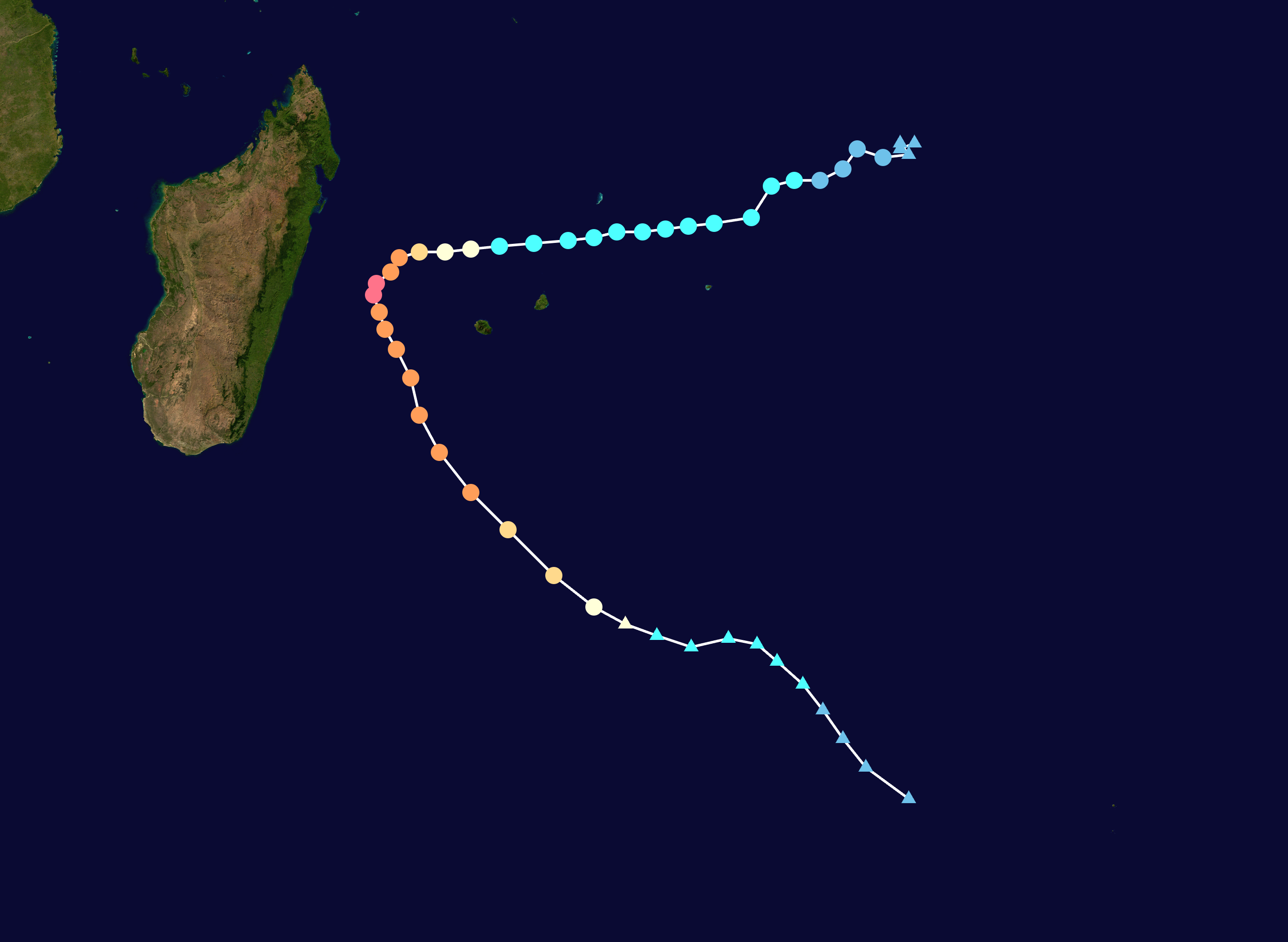
- Duration: February 1 – February 9
- Peak intensity: 185 km/h (115 mph) (10-min); 930 hPa (mbar)

On February 1, MFR began issuing advisories on an area of disturbed weather newly formed in the central Indian Ocean. JTWC assessed the potential for the development of a significant tropical cyclone within next 24 hours as "poor". JTWC upgraded the disturbance's chances of forming into a tropical cyclone to "fair". On February 2, RSMC designated the area of disturbed weather as "Zone of Disturbed Weather 08. " Later that day JTWC upgraded the disturbance's chances to "good" and issued a Tropical Cyclone Formation Alert. Later that day MFR upgraded Zone of Disturbed Weather 08 into Tropical Disturbance 08. On February 3, JTWC was upgraded the system to Tropical Cyclone 13S, MFR re-designated Tropical Disturbance 08 to Moderate Tropical Storm Gael. Early next day on February 5, MFR upgraded it to Severe Tropical Storm Gael. The system quickly intensified that morning into a Tropical Cyclone north of Réunion Island in the early afternoon. Gael was upgraded to an Intense Tropical Cyclone in the evening on February 6. It held that strength for the next couple of days before weakening back to a Severe Tropical Storm. On February 10, the JTWC issued its final warning on Gael as it had transitioned into a cold-core system over the Southern Ocean which then merged with the extratropical remnants of Innis.

On February 3, Metéo-France issued a pre-cyclone alert (yellow alert) for the islands near Réunion. The next day, Mauritius Meteorological Services issued their Cyclone Warning Class II as Gael approached northeast of the island. Two fatalities occurred on Réunion as a result of heavy rain produced by Gael. A motorcyclist was swept away after trying to cross a submerged road. The other death occurred after a man, who was reportedly drunk, attempted to swim across a flooded road. He was overcome by the waters and swept away. Officials in Madagascar warned the public about the possibility of torrential rains, mudslides, and significant property damage from Gael.

=== Severe Tropical Storm Hina ===
- Severe tropical storm (MFR)
- Category 1 tropical cyclone (SSHWS)
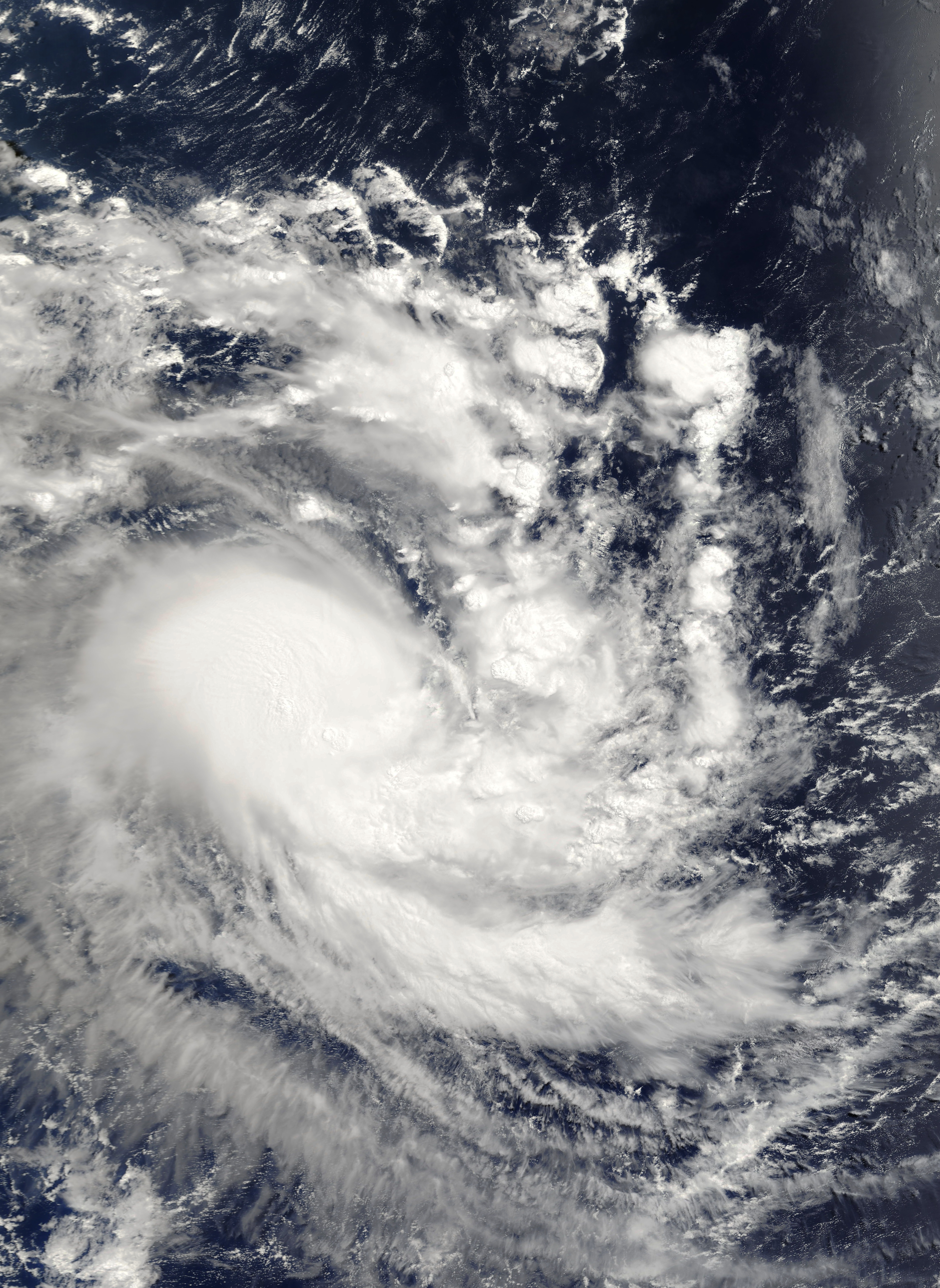
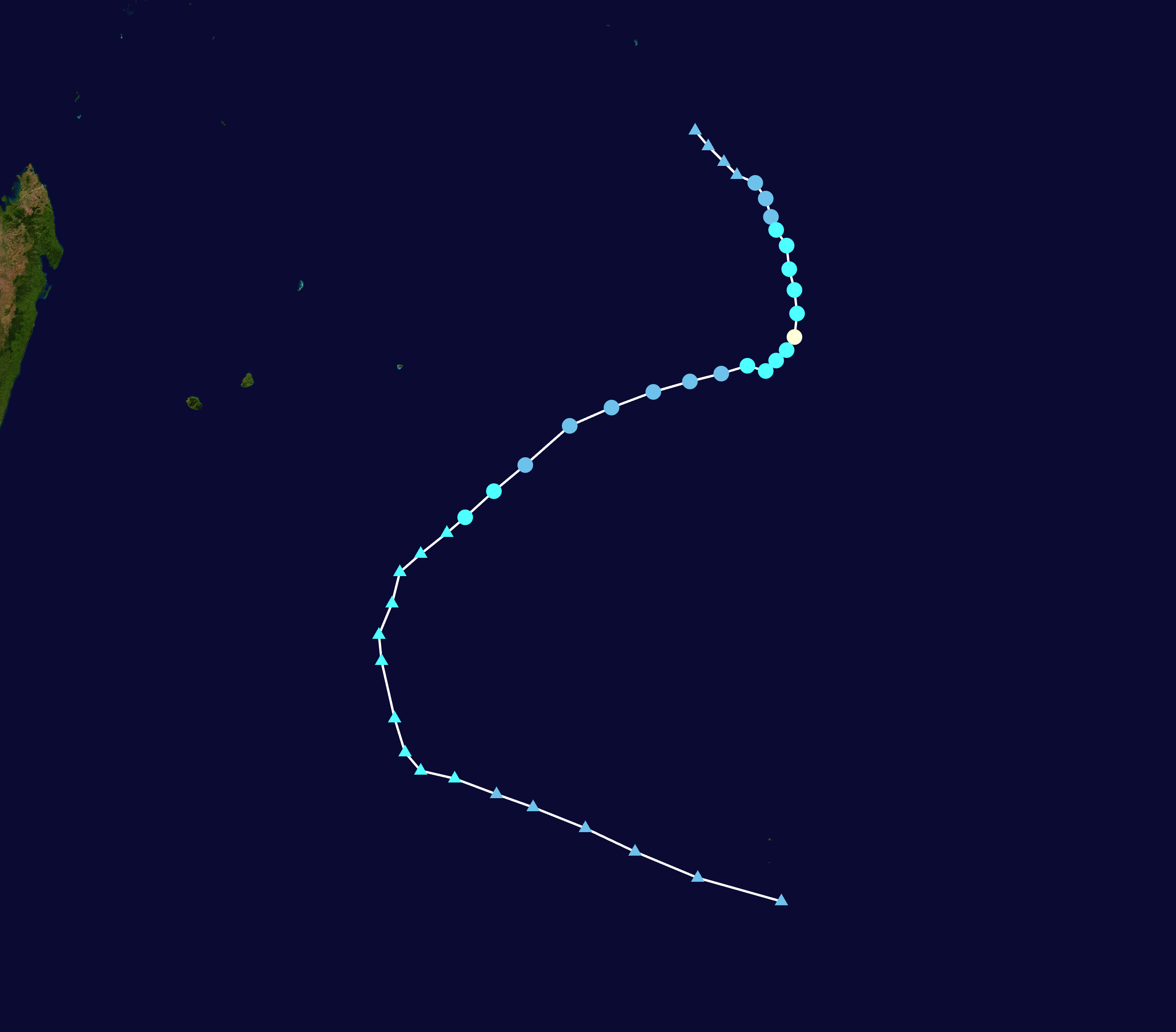
- Duration: February 20 – February 26
- Peak intensity: 105 km/h (65 mph) (10-min); 976 hPa (mbar)

On February 20, the Joint Typhoon Warning Center began issuing advisories on an area of disturbed weather newly formed in the central Indian Ocean. Later that day, JTWC assessed the disturbance's potential for the development of a significant tropical cyclone within next 24 hours as Poor. Early on February 21, JTWC upgraded the disturbance's chances of forming into a tropical cyclone from Poor to Fair. In the afternoon, JTWC upgraded the system to Good and issued a Tropical Cyclone Formation Alert. The JTWC then upgraded the disturbance to a Tropical Cyclone 16S, and it is forecast gradually move southwestward and strengthen for the next couple of days. It already began to show a defined organization with some convective banding that same day. Mauritius Meteorological Services upgraded the Zone of Disturbed Weather 09 intensifying to Moderate Tropical Storm and named it Hina. The next day, it became a Severe Tropical Storm. Later on February 25, Hina weakened to a Moderate Tropical Storm and then weakened to a tropical disturbance as wind shear removed all convection from the centre. Early on February 24, JTWC issued their final warning on 16S for the same reason.

=== Tropical Depression 10 ===
- Tropical depression (MFR)
- Tropical storm (SSHWS)
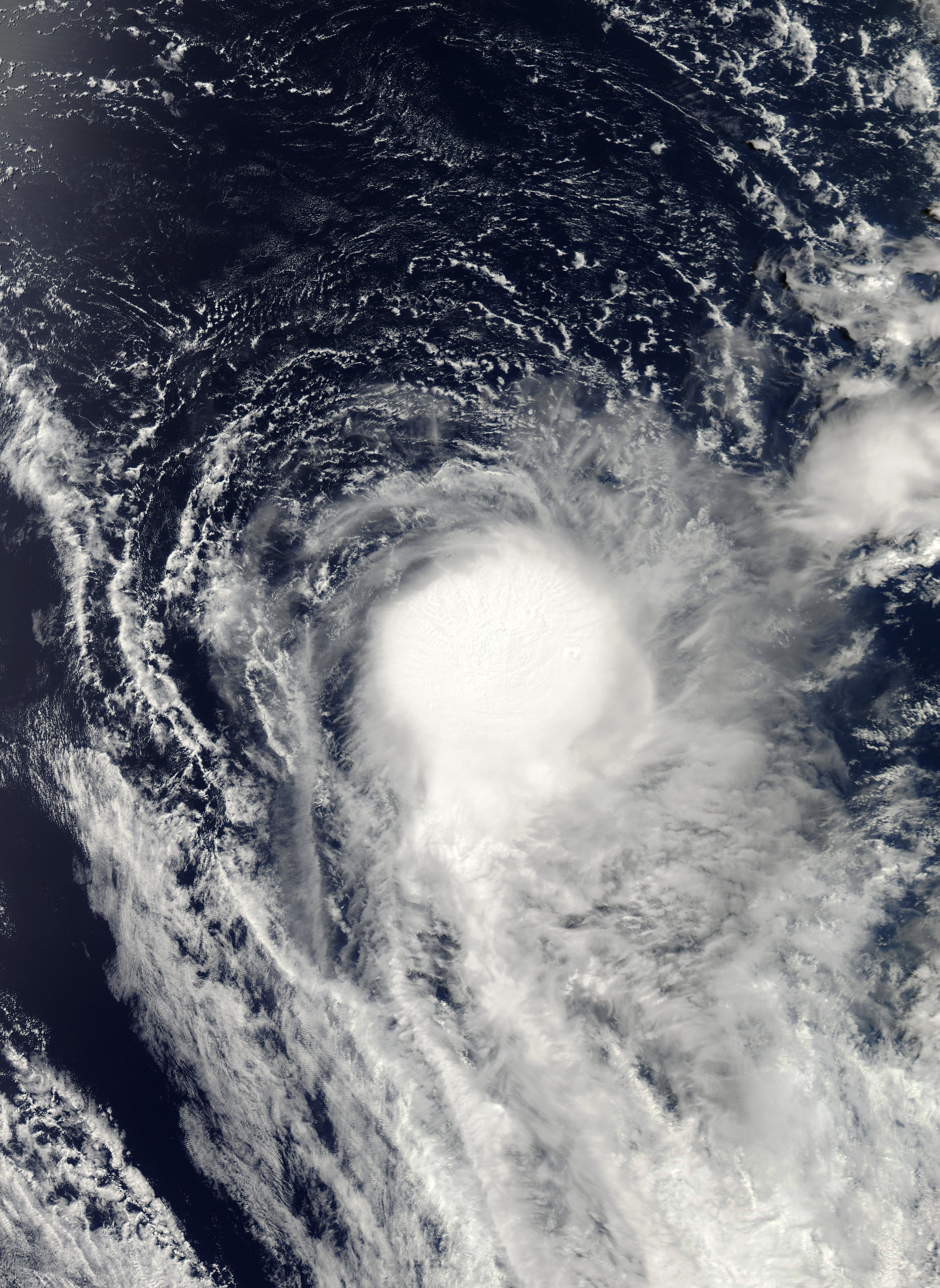
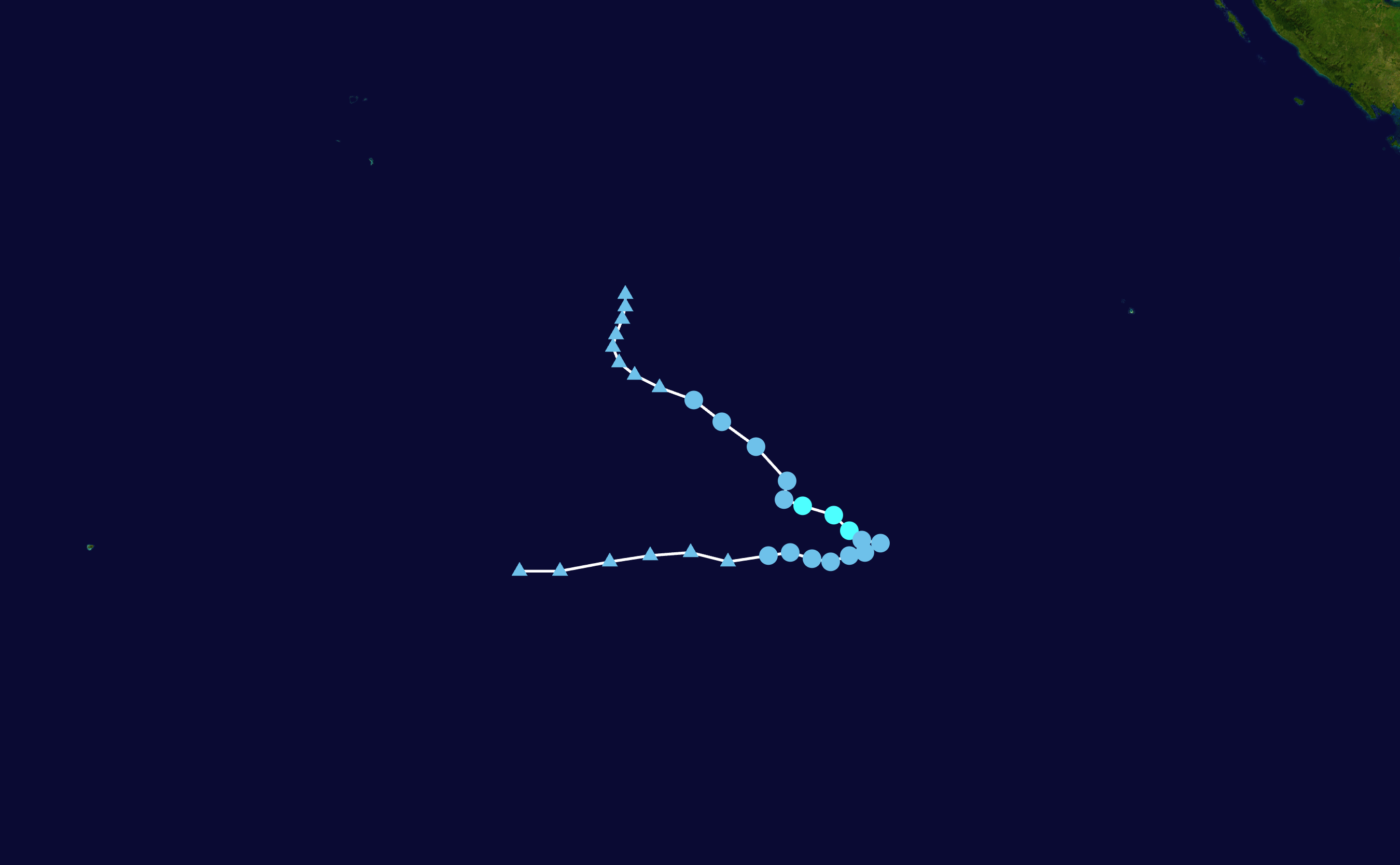
- Duration: March 6 – March 10
- Peak intensity: 55 km/h (35 mph) (10-min); 997 hPa (mbar)

On March 6, the JTWC began monitoring a newly formed area of disturbed weather in the central Indian Ocean, and two days later, they issued a Tropical Cyclone Formation Alert on the disturbance and upgraded it to Zone of Disturbed Weather 10. On March 9, the disturbance was upgraded to a depression and was reclassified as Tropical Cyclone 19S. Wind shear strongly affected the system and caused it to dissipate in the early morning of March 10. The depression did not intensify to a tropical storm, it was the first to do so since the first disturbance of the season formed on October 6.

=== Severe Tropical Storm Izilda ===
- Severe tropical storm (MFR)
- Category 1 tropical cyclone (SSHWS)
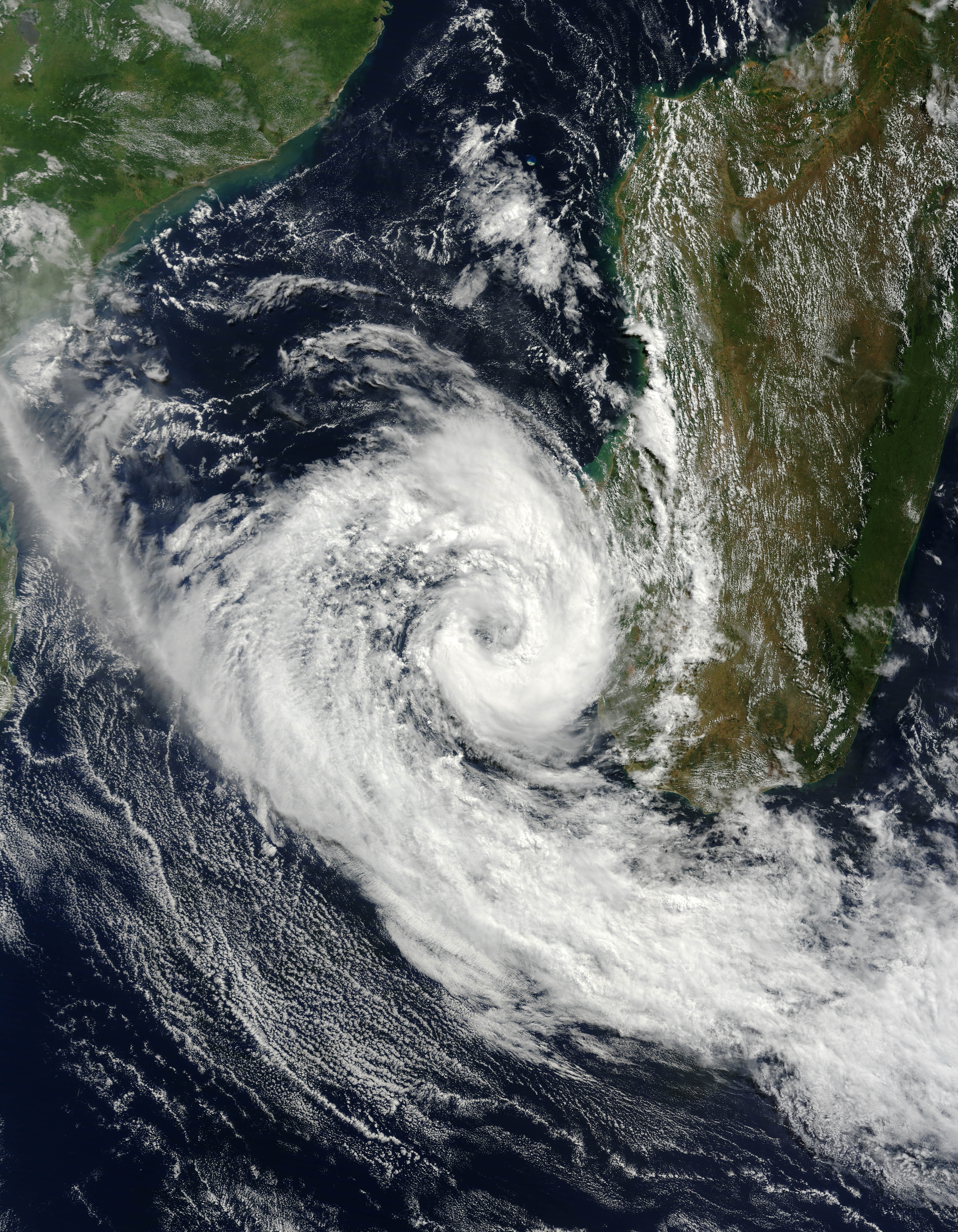
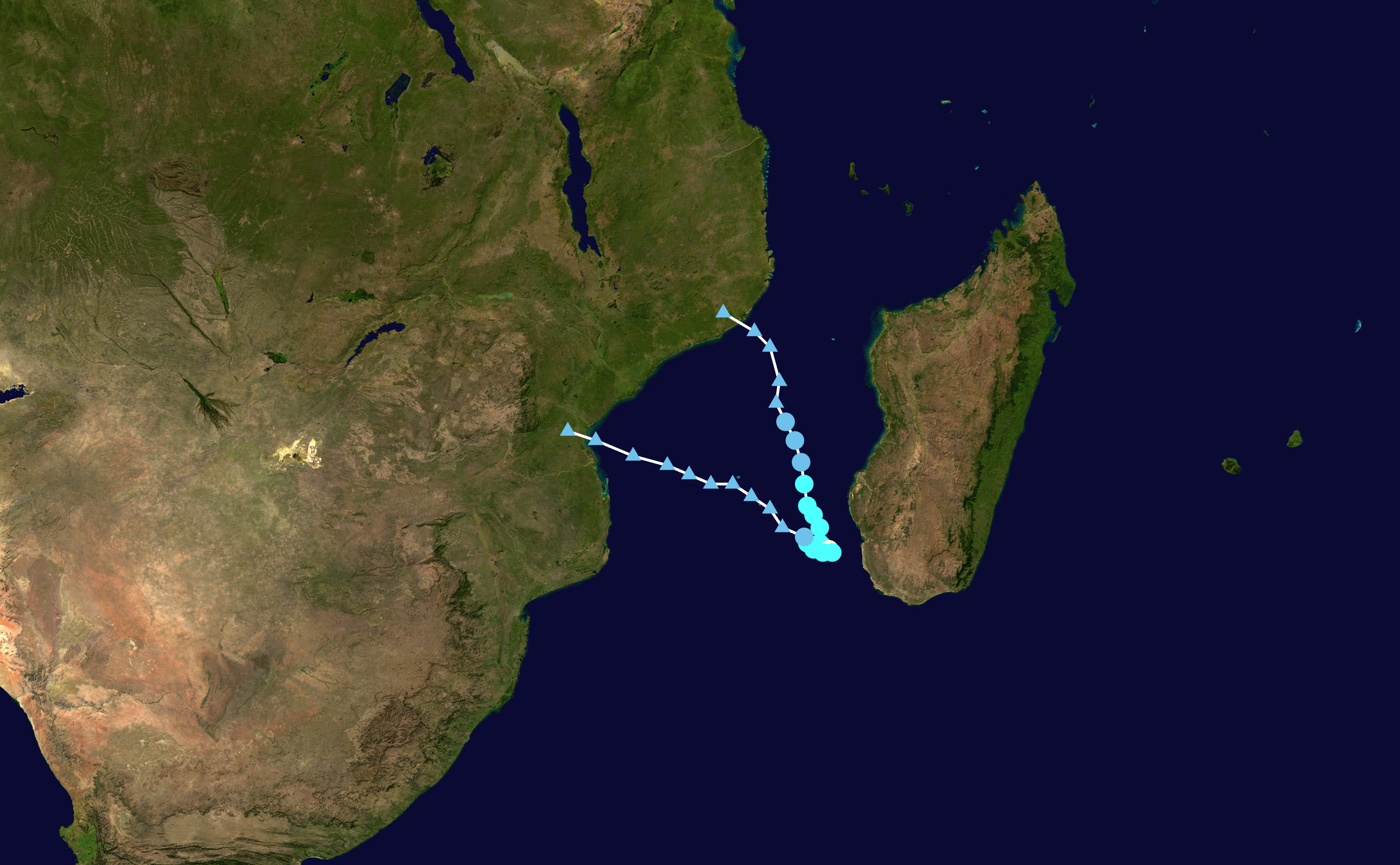
- Duration: March 22 – March 27
- Peak intensity: 110 km/h (70 mph) (10-min); 978 hPa (mbar)

A Tropical Disturbance formed in the Mozambique Channel around March 21 and on March 24 the JTWC issued a Tropical Cyclone Formation Alert and designated the system Tropical Cyclone 24S. The system is expected to drift very slowly south then south-west, remaining quasi-stationary. Around midday on the 25th, Izilda was upgraded to a severe tropical storm with 65 mph winds. It remained at that intensity throughout the day, but land interaction with Madagascar and wind shear caused Izilda to dissipate later on the 27th.

Due to the proximity of Izilda to Madagascar, storm warnings were put in place for coastal areas between Morondava and Toliara. Fishermen were advised to remain at port due to large swells produced by the storm. Officials in Mozambique feared that the storm would bring heavy rains to areas already suffering from severe flooding which has left over 4,000 people homeless. Fishermen in the country were also advised not to leave port due to the dangerous conditions. As a tropical depression, Izilda passed near Europa Island; however, no damage was reported. Izilda brought moderate rainfall to parts of southwest Madagascar and Europa Island. Waves up to 8 m (26.2 ft) impacted coastal areas of Madagascar as Izilda stalled on March 25.

=== Severe Tropical Storm Jade ===
- Severe tropical storm (MFR)
- Category 1 tropical cyclone (SSHWS)
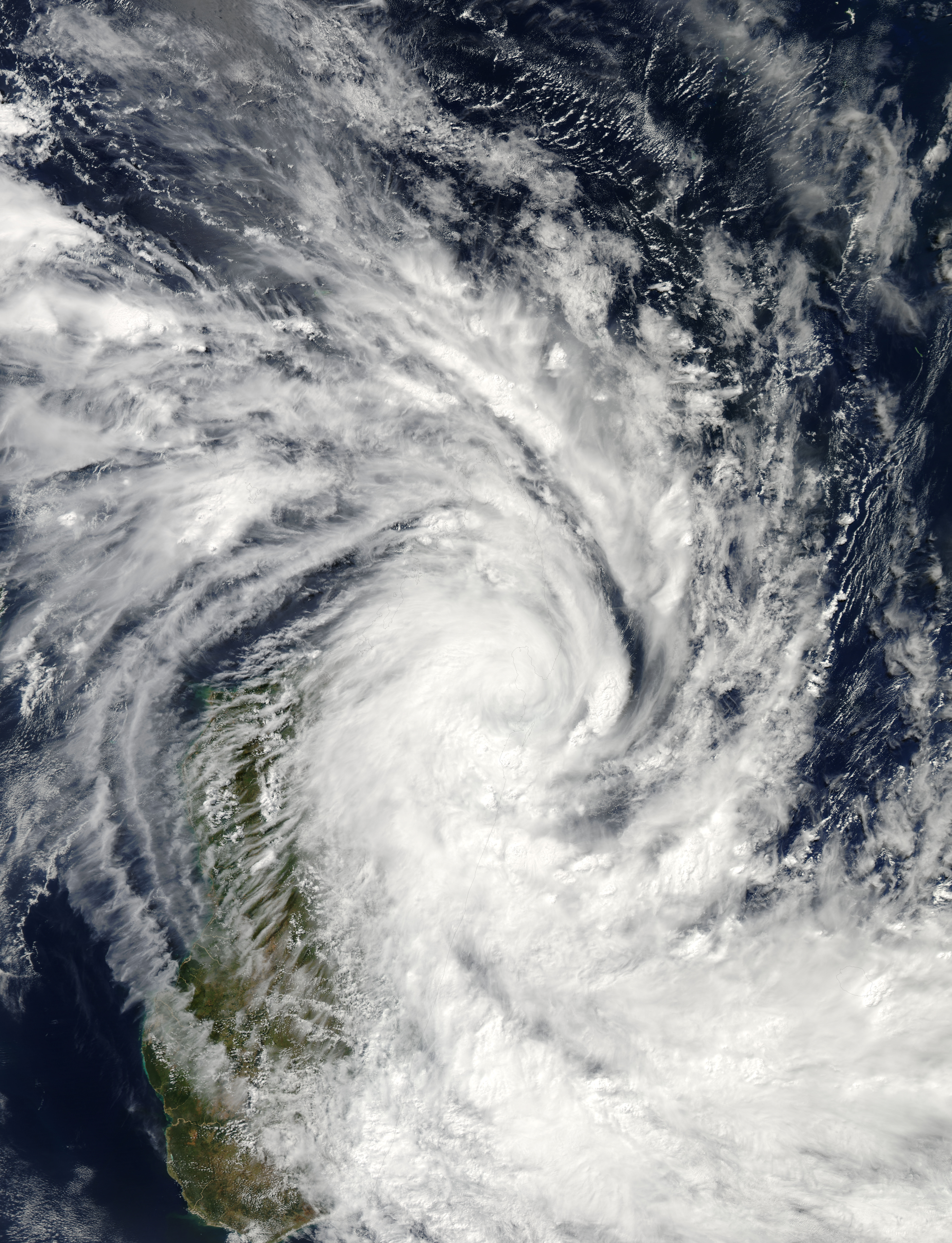
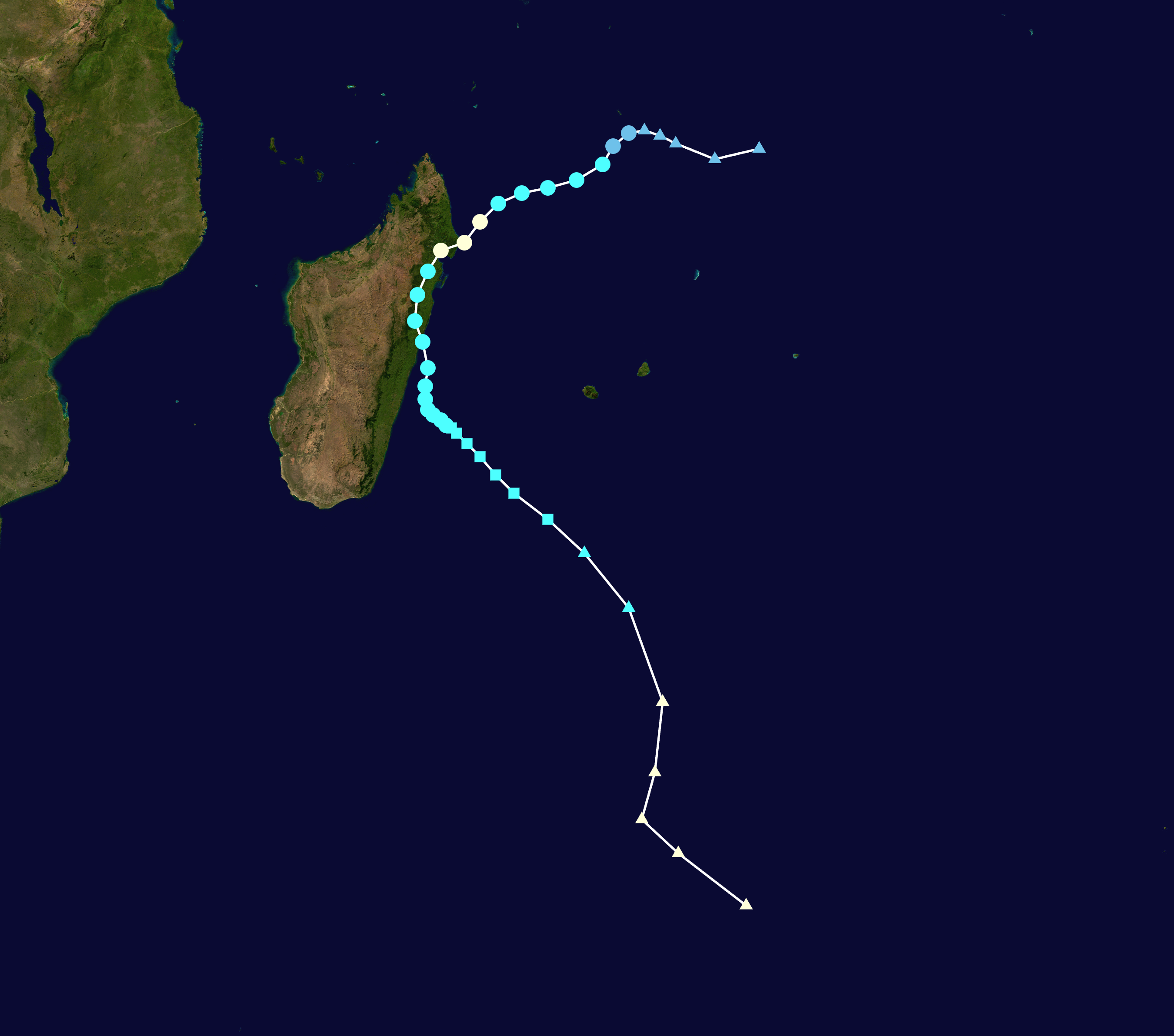
- Duration: April 3 – April 10
- Peak intensity: 110 km/h (70 mph) (10-min); 975 hPa (mbar)

On April 4, an area of disturbed weather formed northeast of Réunion. JTWC reported the disturbance's chance of forming into a tropical cyclone as "good" and issued Tropical Cyclone Formation Alert, and MFR began designating the system as Zone of Disturbed Weather 12. Later that day, JTWC upgraded the system to Tropical Cyclone 26S. Early next day, the disturbance intensified into Tropical Depression 12 as predicted by MFR. Later on that afternoon, MFR upgraded the tropical depression to a moderate tropical storm, naming it Jade. Later that evening, Jade was upgraded to a severe tropical storm. Jade made landfall near Antalaha, Madagascar between 06:00 and 08:00 UTC on April 6 and weakened to a moderate tropical storm. Soon after, Jade weakened to an overland depression. On April 7, Jade exited the coast of Madagascar. However, later that day, Jade reintensified into a moderate tropical storm. Then, on April 8, Jade was again upgraded to a severe tropical storm by La Réunion. The storm became nearly stationary southeast of Madagascar later that day. It became extratropical soon afterwards but was quite powerful reaching a central air pressure of 948 millibars.

Heavy rains from the cyclone in northern Madagascar caused a home to collapse, killing three people. At least 800 others were left homeless due to the storm in northern Madagascar. Five other people were killed in a mudslide near Mananjary and another 3,320 were left homeless. A ninth person was killed on April 9 during a landslide in Nosy Varika. In all, Jade killed 15 people and left 22,900 others homeless throughout Madagascar.

== Storm names ==
Tropical disturbances were named upon reaching moderate tropical storm strength. When a tropical disturbance reached this intensity west of 55°E, then the Sub-Regional Tropical Cyclone Advisory Centre in Madagascar assigned the appropriate name to the storm. If it reached moderate tropical storm strength between 55°E and 90°E, then the Sub-Regional Tropical Cyclone Advisory Centre in Mauritius named the storm. New name lists are used every year, so no names are retired. The naming list for the 2008–09 South-West Indian Ocean was announced by Météo-France on August 20, 2008, and is as follows:

- Asma
- Bernard
- Cinda
- Dongo
- Eric
- Fanele
- Gael
- Hina
- Izilda
- Jade
- Kago (unused)
- Lisebo (unused)
- Magoma (unused)
- Newa (unused)
- Owami (unused)
- Pulane (unused)
- Qoli (unused)
- Rute (unused)
- Sama (unused)
- Tsholo (unused)
- Uzale (unused)
- Vimbai (unused)
- Wada (unused)
- Xylo (unused)
- Yamba (unused)
- Zita (unused)

== Season effects ==
This table lists all the storms that developed in the Southern Hemisphere during the 2008–2009 South-West Indian Ocean cyclone season. It includes their intensity, duration, name, landfalls, deaths, and damages. All data is taken from Météo-France. The damage figures are all from 2009 USD.

Name	Dates	Peak intensity			Areas affected	Damage (USD)	Deaths	Ref(s).
Name	Dates	Category	Wind speed	Pressure	Areas affected	Damage (USD)	Deaths	Ref(s).
One	October 6 — 8, 2008	Zone of disturbed weather	35 km/h (25 mph)	1006 hPa (29.71 inHg)	None	None	None	
Asma	October 15 — 24	Moderate Tropical Storm	75 km/h (45 mph)	988 hPa (29.18 inHg)	Northern Madagascar		1	
Bernard	November 13–21	Moderate Tropical Storm	65 km/h (40 mph)	995 hPa (29.38 inHg)	None	None	None	
Cinda	December 13–24	Severe tropical storm	95 km/h (60 mph)	985 hPa (29.09 inHg)	None	None	None	
Dongo	January 7–12	Severe tropical storm	95 km/h (60 mph)	984 hPa (29.06 inHg)	None	None	None	
Eric	January 16–22	Moderate Tropical Storm	95 km/h (60 mph)	991 hPa (29.26 inHg)	Madagascar	Minimal	2	
Fanele	January 17–22	Intense tropical cyclone	185 km/h (115 mph)	930 hPa (27.46 inHg)	Madagascar		10	
Gael	February 1–9	Intense tropical cyclone	185 km/h (115 mph)	930 hPa (27.46 inHg)	Madagascar		2	
Hina	February 20–26	Severe tropical storm	105 km/h (65 mph)	976 hPa (28.82 inHg)	None	None	None	
10	March 6–10	Tropical depression	55 km/h (35 mph)	997 hPa (29.44 inHg)	None	None	None	
Izilda	March 22–27	Severe tropical storm	110 km/h (70 mph)	978 hPa (28.88 inHg)	None	None	None	
Jade	April 3–10	Severe tropical storm	110 km/h (70 mph)	975 hPa (28.79 inHg)	Madagascar		15	
Season aggregates
12 systems	October 6 – April 10		185 km/h (115 mph)	930 hPa (27.46 inHg)			30	

== See also ==
- Tropical cyclones in: 2008, 2009
- Atlantic hurricane seasons: 2008, 2009
- Pacific hurricane seasons: 2008, 2009
- Pacific typhoon seasons: 2008, 2009
- North Indian Ocean cyclone seasons: 2008, 2009
- Australian region cyclone seasons: 2008–09, 2009–10
- South Pacific cyclone seasons: 2008–09, 2009–10
