= Weather of 2008 =

The following is a list of weather events that occurred in 2008. The year began with La Niña conditions. There were several natural disasters around the world from various types of weather, including blizzards, cold waves, droughts, heat waves, tornadoes, and tropical cyclones. In early May, powerful Cyclone Nargis struck Myanmar, killing or leaving missing at least 138,373 people and becoming the deadliest single weather event of the year. There were several other weather events that caused significant death and destruction, such as Typhoon Fengshen, which killed over 1,400 people, and the 2008 Afghanistan blizzard, which killed over 900 people. In the United States, there were a total of twelve billion-dollar disasters which caused between $80 billion and $104.8 billion in damage (adjusted for inflation). A total of 572 deaths were reported due to weather-related phenomena in the United States, and over 2,400 injuries.

== Global conditions ==
The year began with La Nina conditions that developed the previous year. The La Nina peaked in February, and after that, sea surface temperatures (SSTs) near the equators began to warm up. As a consequence, by June, NOAA assessed that the El Nino-Southern Oscillation (ENSO) had transitioned to its normal phase. This neutral phase remained through the remainder of the year, with below-average SSTs. Despite being the coldest year since 2000, the year was still one of the top 10 warmest years on record.

== Weather summaries by type ==
=== Cold waves and winter storms ===
In early January 2008, a blizzard impacted parts of Iran, killing 21 people. At around the same time, the Pacific Northwest was hit by a storm system, causing at least 12 deaths. In mid-January, the third-deadliest blizzard in history struck Afghanistan, killing at least 926 people. At around the same time, a cold blast struck China, causing heavy snow and ice until early February, accompanied with cold weather. Direct economic losses were estimated at over $22 billion($32.9 billion in 2025), and at least 129 people were killed.

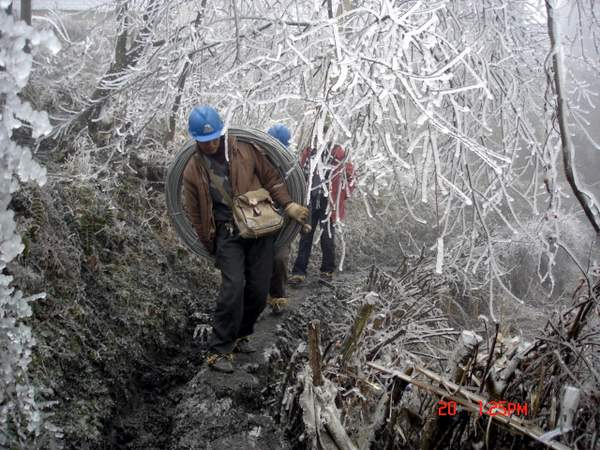
Ice accumulation on trees near Bijie after the 2008 Chinese winter storms.

In early February, a snowstorm impacted the Central Plains and the Great Lakes, causing at least 4 deaths. Later in the month, a system moved through the Northeast and Mid-Atlantic, killing at least 6 people.

In March, the North American blizzard of 2008 moved through parts of the United States and Canada, killing 17 people and causing nearly $800 million of damage.

On May 26 and 27, Mongolia was hit with a heavy snowstorm causing at least 52 fatalities. Hundreds of thousands of heads of livestock were killed or went missing.

In late October, a blizzard in Tibet dumped nearly 25 inches of snow. Six people were reported dead.

In December, the December 2008 Northeastern United States ice storm knocked out power to over a million people and caused three fatalities. Soon after, a snowstorm impacted large swaths of Canada and the United States, killing eight people in an avalanche in British Columbia.

=== Droughts ===
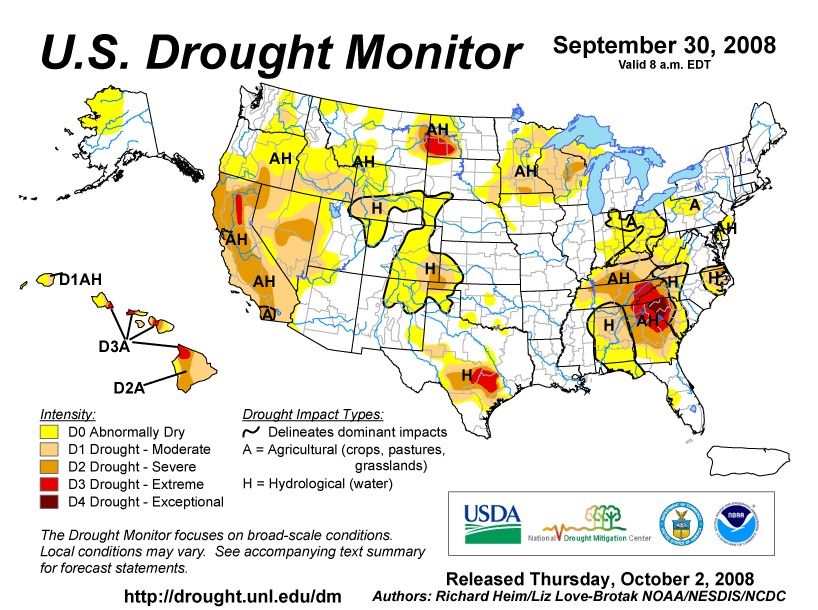
A drought map of the United States in September 2008.

In late 2007, drought enveloped Zimbabwe while the country's economy struggled and political problems continued. This problem continued into 2008. Kenya was also in drought starting in 2008 that persisted into 2011, causing an estimated $12 billion in losses. In addition, a multi-year drought enveloped Victoria and New South Wales in Australia between 2007 and 2009. This drought was devastating for farmers. California was also in a dry spell, which contributed to the devastating 2008 California wildfire season.

=== Floods ===
2008 was characterized by large amounts of precipitation in parts of the world, including northern South America.

Between November 2007 and February 2008, heavy rain hit parts of Bolivia, causing floods that killed 50 people.

In January, 46 people in eastern Africa died from floods triggered by unexpected heavy rain.

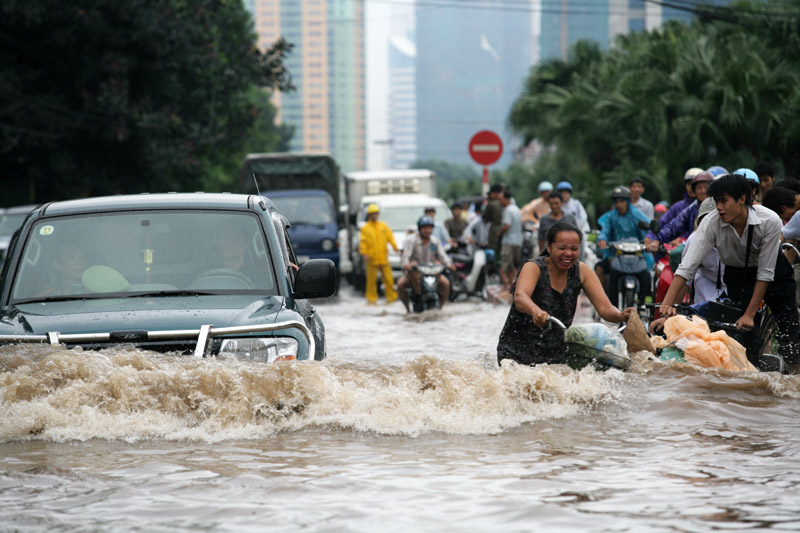
Flooding in Hanoi.

In February, heavy rain in Angola triggered floods in Namibia, covering thousands of square kilometers of land and killing at least 42 people by early March. This led to a cholera outbreak and by the 16th of April, 958 cases were reported, with four of them being fatal. In addition, the Philippines received heavy rain, causing flooding and landslides and killing 45 people.

In March, the Midwest received heavy rain, leading to floods that killed 17 people.

In late May, southern parts of China received four rounds of torrential rainfall, resulting in multiple rounds of floods that in total killed over 150 people.

During the monsoon season, floods hit parts of India, killing over 2,400 people and submerging over 1,800 villages. The Kosi embankment broke, sending large amounts of water and flooding villages in northern Bihar and Nepal.

In September, heavy rains caused the retaining wall of a reservoir in China to collapse, causing a major mudslide that inundated a village and killed 277 people.

In early October, Algeria experiences flash flooding, killing 89 people near the town of Ghardaïa. In late October into early November, northern and central areas of Vietnam and parts of southern China experienced flooding after three days of heavy rainfall. At least 100 people were killed, with 66 in Vietnam and 34 in China. A few weeks later, Santa Catarina, Brazil was hit by deadly floods caused by heavy rainfall that killed at least 128 people.

=== Heat waves and wildfires ===
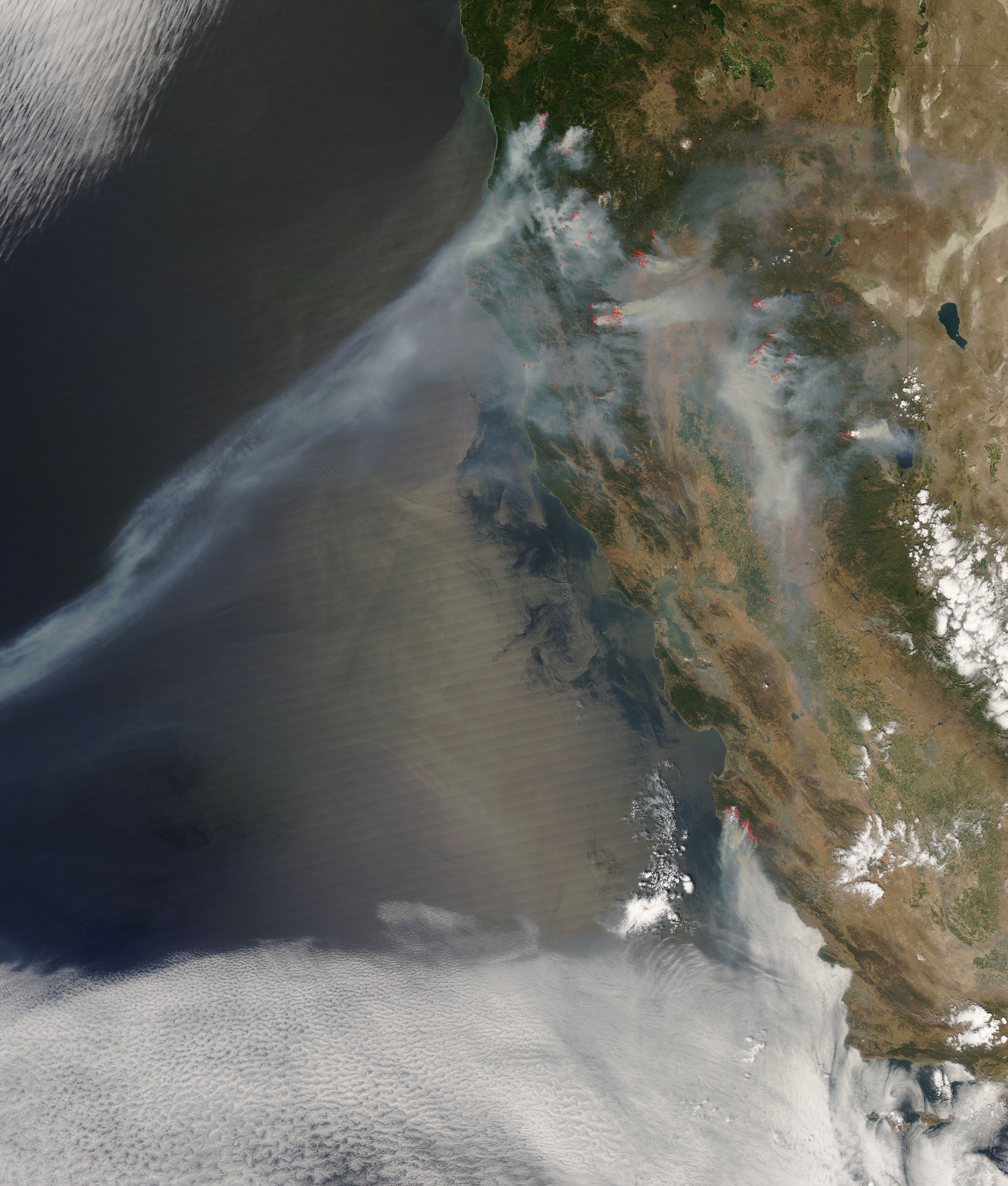
A satellite image showing the 2008 California wildfires on July 9.

In March, a long-lasting, intense heatwave gripped southern Australia, breaking many records. In Adelaide, it was the longest heatwave ever recorded at the time.

In April, several wildfires burned in the south-central United States, with one wind-driven fire killing three people in Colorado.

In June, a heatwave broke several records in the northeastern United States. About twenty fatalities were recorded, eighteen of which were in the Philadelphia area. Later in the month, California experienced a heat wave, with some records being broken. Six more people were killed when another heatwave hit the Philadelphia area in mid-July.

In addition, around the same time, large amounts of dry thunderstorms swept across California, causing over 2,000 fires. During the summer, wildfires killed over a dozen firefighters and one civilian and injured several others. A helicopter accident killed nine people, most of them firefighters.

In August, four people were killed in the Dallas area after a long period of hot, humid conditions impacted the area.

=== Tornadoes ===
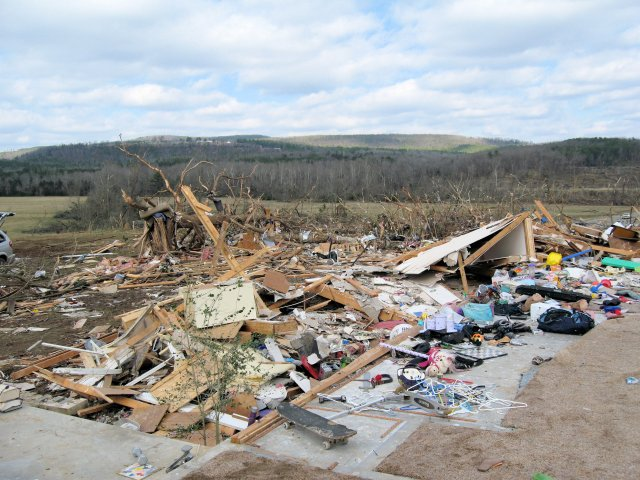
A home that was swept off its foundation in the Super Tuesday tornado outbreak. The damage would be rated EF4.

2008 was an active year for tornadoes in the United States, with 1,692 tornadoes confirmed. These tornadoes killed 126 people in the US. Fatalities were also reported in China, France, Bangladesh, and Poland. January and February were unusually active for tornadoes in the United States. In January, a sequence of tornado outbreaks impacted the Midwest, with at least 54 tornado reports confirmed from January 7–8, the strongest being an EF3. The outbreak was responsible for at least five deaths. In February, the largest February tornado outbreak in history and the deadliest tornado outbreak in 23 years for the United States impacted the Mid-South and the Tennessee Valley, producing 87 tornadoes (five of them rated EF4) and causing 57 fatalities across four states, with more than half of them being in Tennessee. Several storm systems moved through the southeast and eastern United States in March and April, with one of them moving through downtown Atlanta. May was a very active month, with 460 tornadoes, making it the third most active May ever recorded. Notable tornadoes include an EF4 that killed 22 people in Oklahoma and Missouri, and an EF5 that impacted the town of Parkersburg, Iowa, killing seven in the town and two in New Hartford. Severe weather continued into June with 289 tornadoes being confirmed. In August, remnants of multiple tropical cyclones produced several tornado reports, with 141 preliminary reports of tornadoes being received. In addition, a tornado outbreak occurred in Europe, with an F4 tornado killing three people in France. Multiple tropical cyclone-related tornado outbreaks occurred in September. In mid-November, two people were killed by tornadoes in North Carolina.

=== Tropical cyclones ===
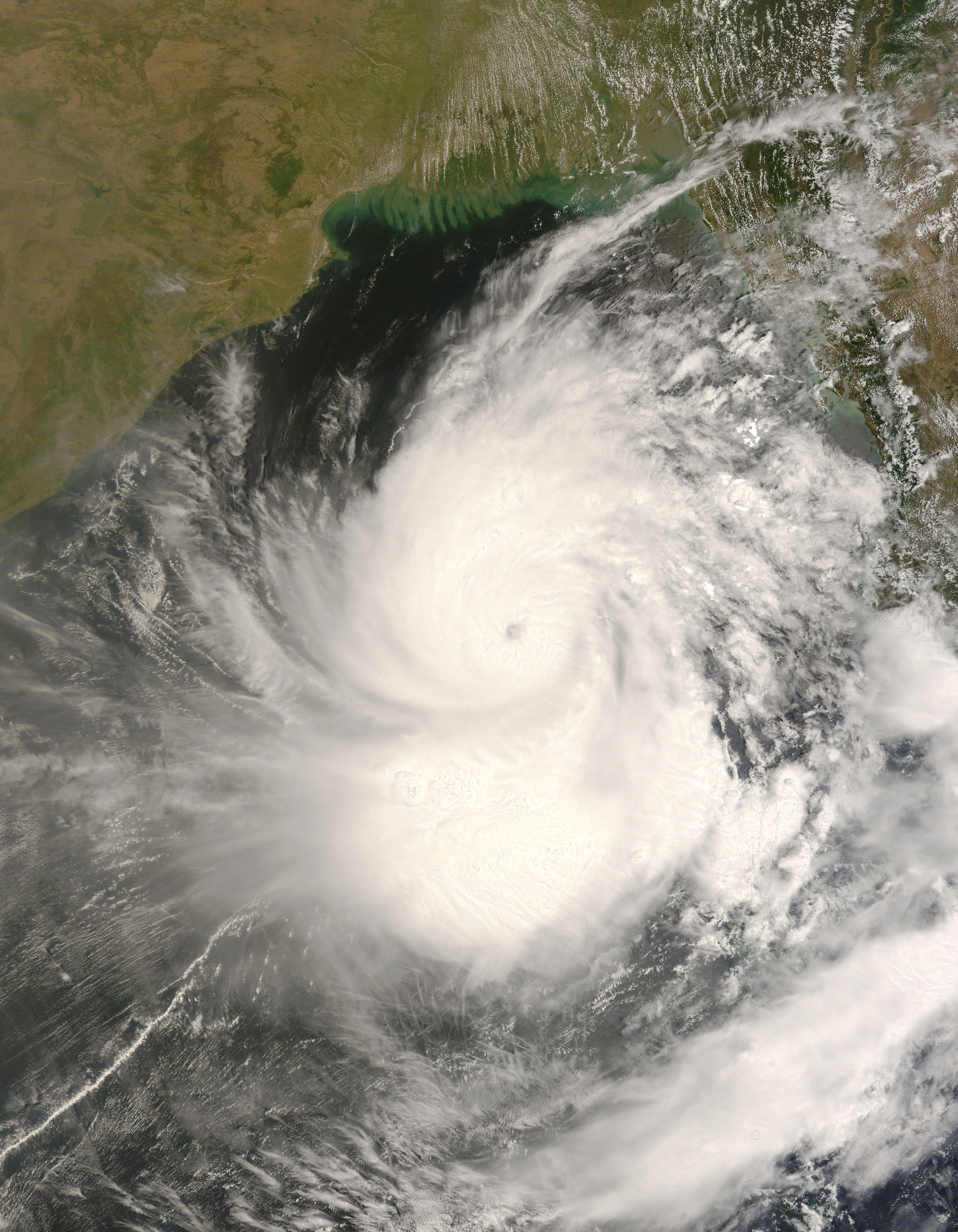
Cyclone Nargis near peak intensity on May 1.

In early February, Cyclone Ivan made landfall in eastern Madagascar, affecting some areas already hit by Cyclone Fame, and killing 93 people and displacing nearly 200,000. Early in March, Cyclone Jokwe impacted parts of Mozambique and the northern tip of Madagascar, killing 20 in Mozambique and destroying over 8,000 homes. In April, Typhoon Neoguri developed and became the earliest tropical cyclone to hit China since 1949. Three fatalities were recorded, and 40 fishermen went missing. Soon after, the deadliest storm to impact Asia since 1991 impacted Myanmar, killing over 138,000 people and causing over $12 billion in damage. In May, Tropical Storm Halong formed west of the Philippines, tracked east, and made landfall on the west coast of the island nation. A total of 61 people were killed and three left missing. In June, Typhoon Fengshen killed over 1,400 people, with 800 of those being on the MV Princess of the Stars when it capsized in the storm. July was an active month for tropical cyclones, with Typhoon Kalmaegi killing a total of 25 people in Taiwan, Korea, and the Philippines. It was soon followed by Hurricane Dolly, causing 22 fatalities, with most of them in Guatemala, and Typhoon Fung-wong, which killed at least 6 people in parts of East Asia and the Philippines. In August, Tropical Storm Kammuri caused major flooding in Vietnam, killing at least 127 people. India was also hit by a tropical depression that killed over 60 people from flooding. In the Atlantic Ocean, Tropical Storm Fay made four landfalls and impacted areas of the Caribbean and Florida, causing 36 fatalities. Fay was soon followed by Gustav, which killed 153 people, more than half which were in Haiti, and Hurricane Hanna, which caused a total of 537 deaths, most of which were attributed to flooding in the northern part of Haiti. In early September, Hurricane Ike made landfall in Texas after sweeping thought the Caribbean, impacting areas already hit by Gustav and causing nearly 200 deaths. A couple weeks later, Typhoon Hagupit impacted large parts of South and Southeast Asia, killing at least 93 people. In October, Hurricane Norbert made landfall in Baja California and Sonora, killing 25 people. Deep Depression ARB 02 affected Yemen, causing massive floods that killed 180 people. In late November, Cyclone Nisha caused devastating floods in Sri Lanka and India, killing a total of 204 people, 189 of which were in India.

== Events of 2008 ==
This is a timeline of weather events in 2008.

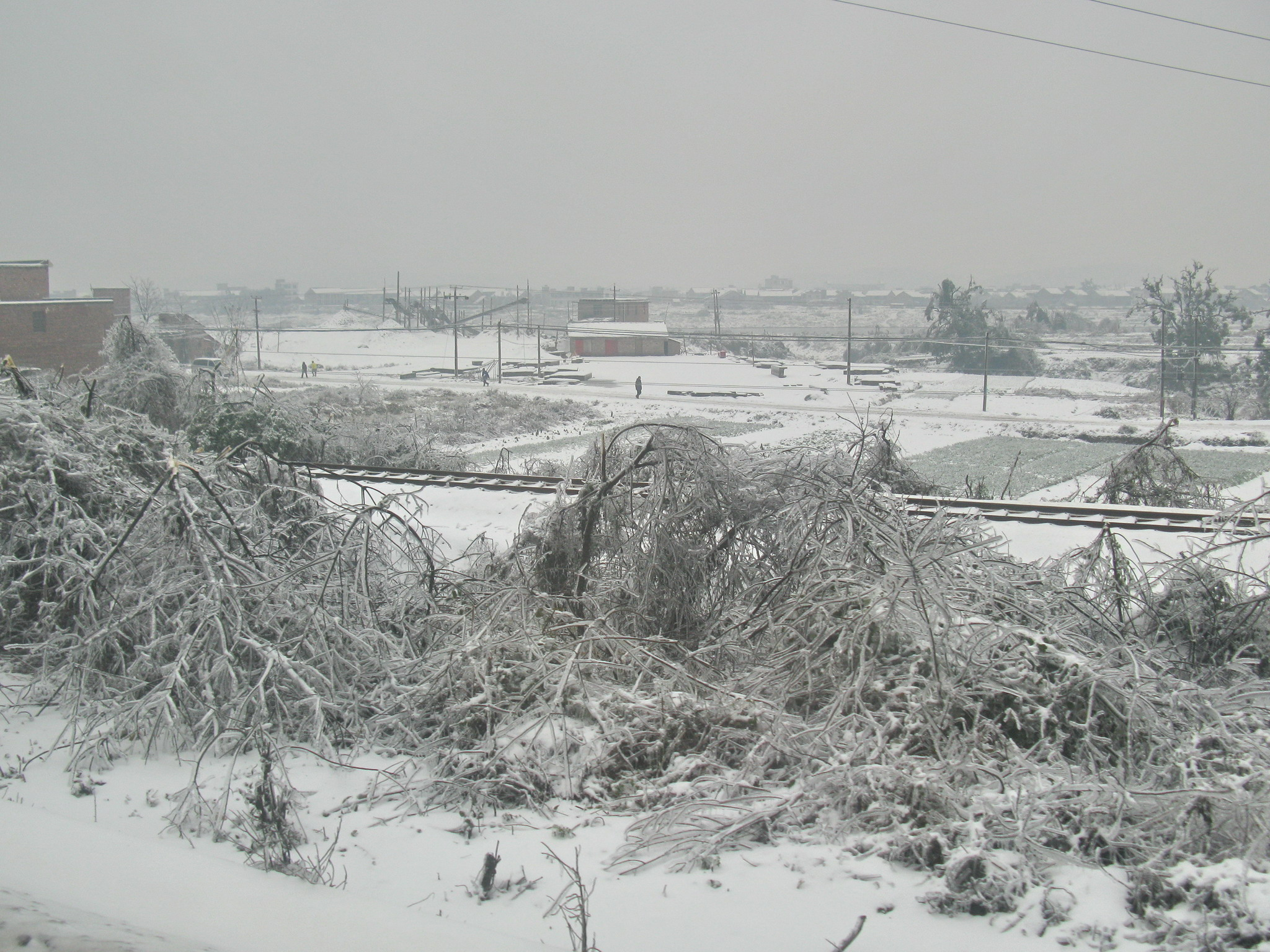
Ice on trees in Leiyang after an ice storm

=== January ===
- Winter of 2007–2008 – The third-deadliest blizzard in history kills at least 926 people in Afghanistan.
- November 2007 – February 2008 – Floods caused by rain killed at least 50 people in Bolivia.
- December 30, 2007 – January 2, 2008 – A winter storm affected parts of the central and northeastern United States. Several people were killed in traffic accidents.
- January 2–3 – A winter storm took place across portions of central Europe, including Bulgaria and Romania. Four sailors perished when their cargo ship sank in the Kerch Strait.
- January 3–11 – A winter storm killed at least 12 people across the Pacific Northwest.
- January 5–7 – A blizzard in Iran kills at least 21 people and injures 88.
- January 7–8 – A tornado outbreak results in 54 confirmed tornadoes across the Midwest. Five people were killed.
- January 10 – February 6 – A major ice storm struck parts of China, causing over $22 billion($32.9 billion in 2025) in economic losses and killing 129.
- January 13 – Flooding in eastern Africa kills 46 people.
- January 24–29 – Cyclone Fame results in 13 fatalities in Madagascar.
- January 24 – February 9 – Cyclone Gene kills seven people in Fiji.

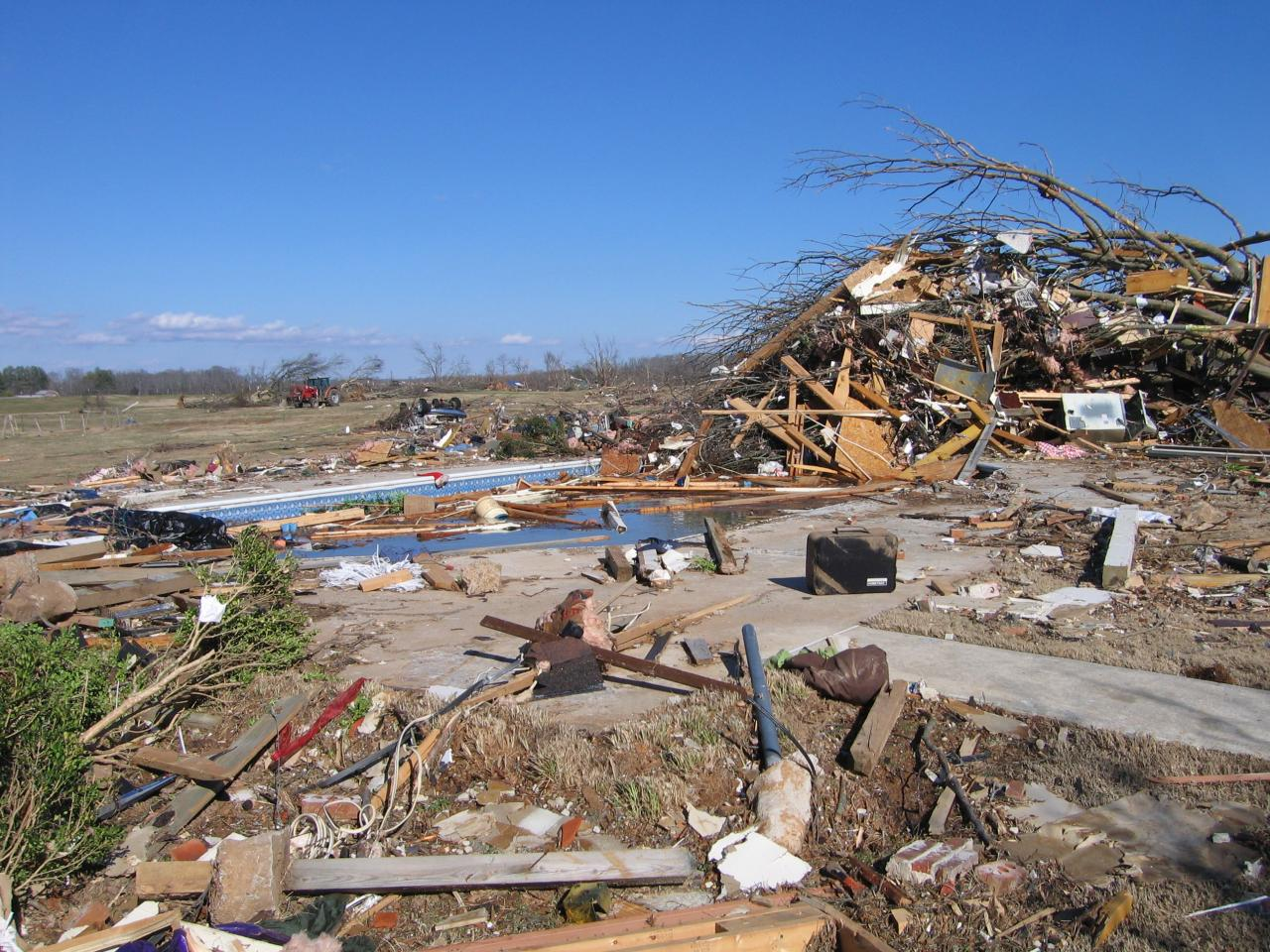
EF4 damage to a large brick home near Moulton, Alabama.

=== February ===
- Early February – April – Floods kill 42 people in Namibia and cause a cholera outbreak with at least four fatal cases.
- February – Heavy rain causes flooding across Ecuador, Bolivia, and Argentina. Nearly 50 fatalities were reported.
- February 5–6 – The largest February tornado outbreak in history causes at least 57 fatalities across the United States.
- February 14–27 – Flooding and landslides caused by heavy rain impact the Philippines, killing 44 people and submerging many houses.
- February 17 – Severe storms sweep through part of the southeastern United States, with 49 reported tornadoes. No deaths were reported, but there were nearly 50 injuries.
- February 17 – Cyclone Ivan makes landfall on Madagascar, affecting areas hit just a month ago by Fame. 93 fatalities were reported.
- February 29 – March 1 – Cyclone Emma impacts several countries in Europe. 15 people were killed or went missing.

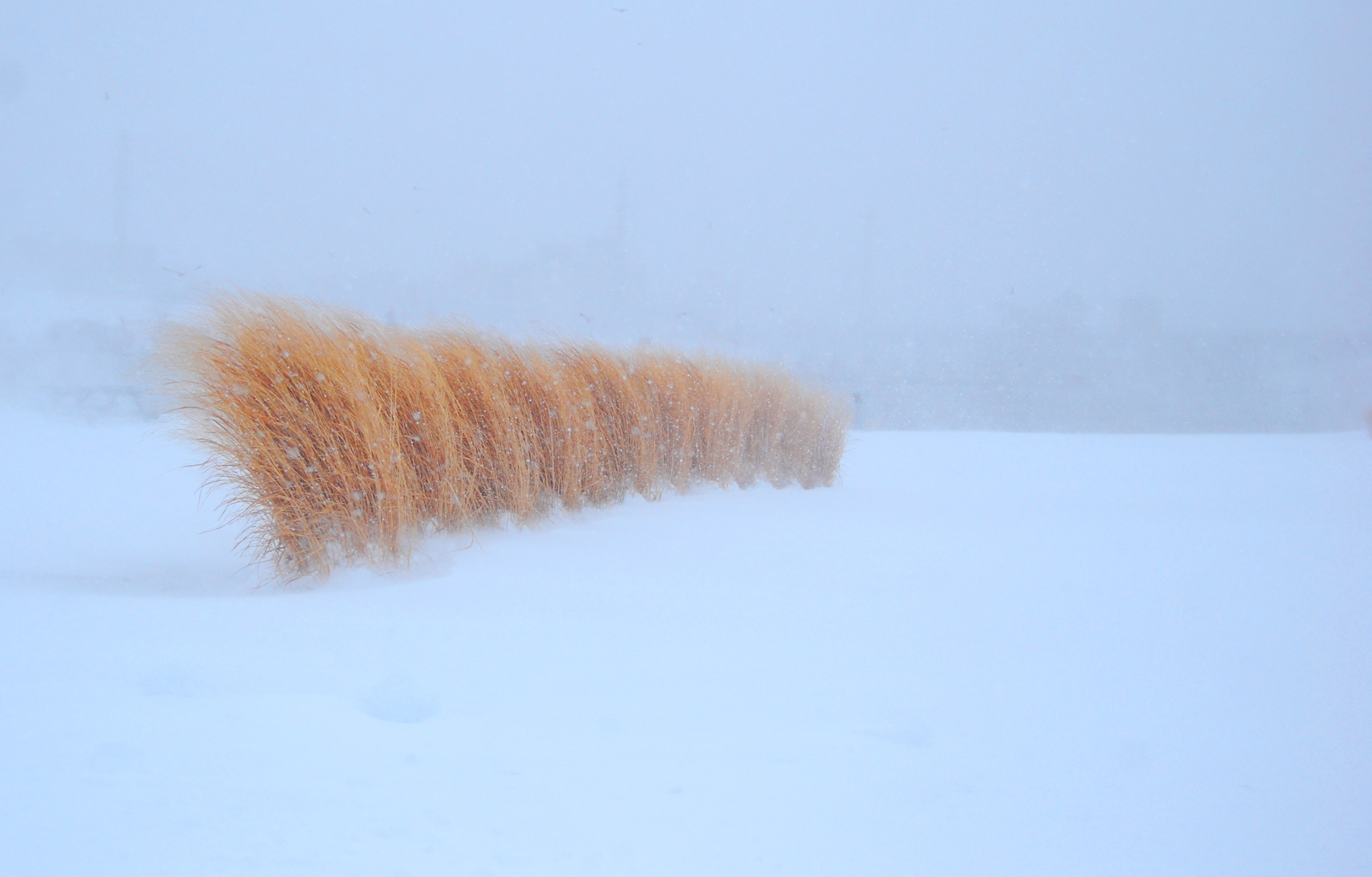
The North American blizzard of 2008 near Cleveland, Ohio

=== March ===
- March 1–17 – The longest heatwave ever recorded in Adelaide scorches Southern Australia, with 15 consecutive days with maximum temperature exceeding 95 °F (35 °C).
- March 5–9 – Cyclone Jokwe makes landfall first in Madagascar, then in Mozambique, causing 20 deaths.
- March 6–10 – The North American blizzard of 2008 causes a total of 17 deaths. One death was attributed to an EF2 tornado in Florida.
- March 17–26 – Floods impact the Midwestern United States, killing 17 people.
- March 28–31 – Heavy rain causes floods in Kenya, killing at least seven.
- March 30 – April 11 – Floods in Brazil kill 26 people in the state of Paraíba.

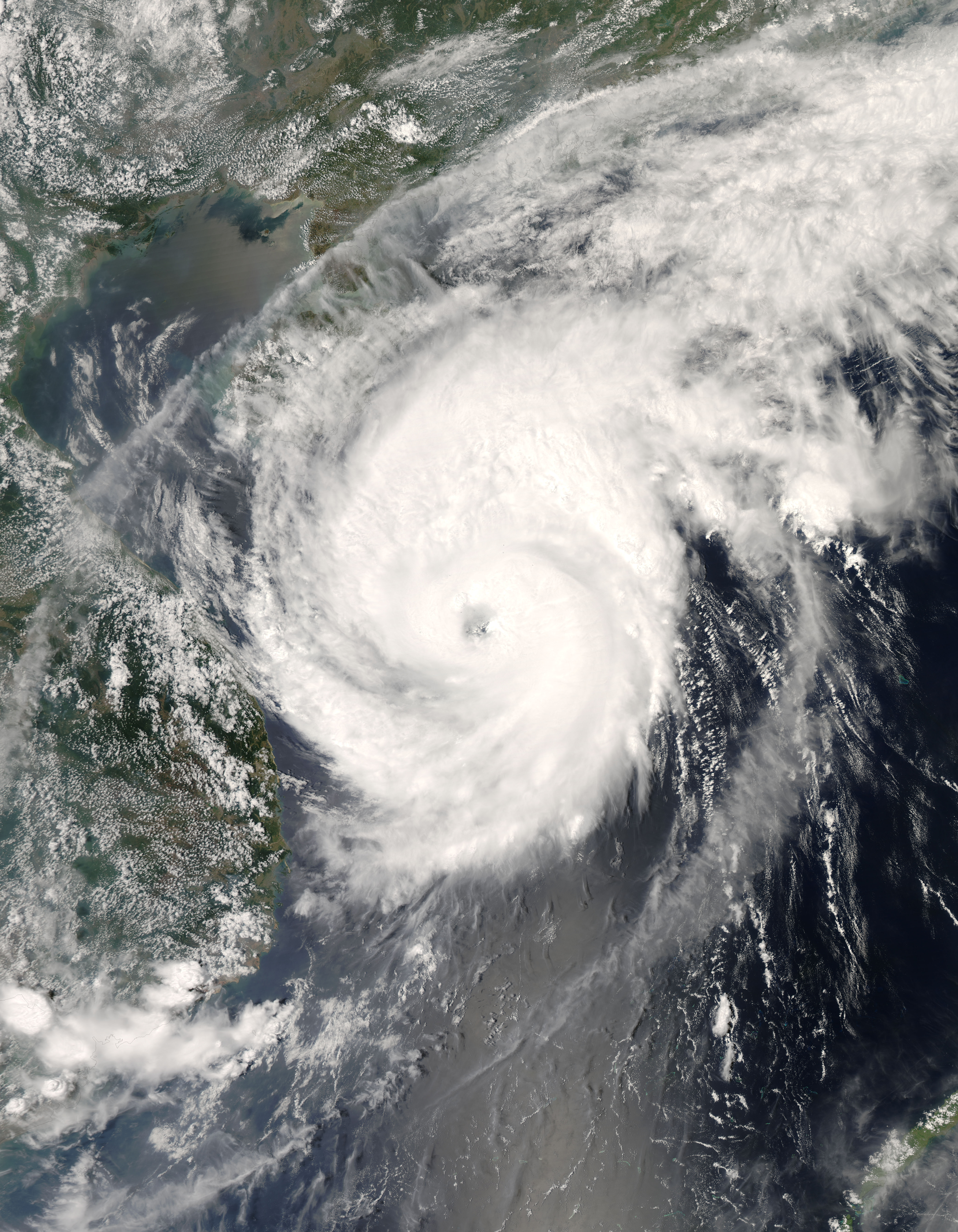
Typhoon Neoguri near peak intensity on April 17.

=== April ===
- April 13–21 – Typhoon Neoguri impacts China, killing three people, two of which were caused by a mudslide. Forty fishermen went missing.
- April 15 – Three people are killed and thousands are evacuated by a wildfire in Colorado.
- April 24 – Three people are killed and two injured when heavy rain triggers a mudslide in Port-au-Prince, Haiti.
- April 27–28 – Floods in Sri Lanka kill seven people.
- April 27 – May 3 – Cyclone Nargis forms and makes landfall in Myanmar. It was the deadliest storm to impact Asia since 1991, killing over 138,000 people and causing over $12 billion in damage.

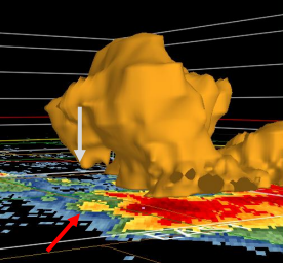
A 3D radar shot of the Parkersburg-New Hartford EF5 tornado.

=== May ===
- May 1–2 – A tornado outbreak with over 90 tornadoes rips through the central United States, causing seven fatalities.
- May 7–11 – A sequence of tornado outbreaks impacts the central United States, with over 80 preliminary reports of tornadoes on May 10 alone. One particularly deadly tornado impacted parts of Oklahoma and Missouri, killing 21 people.
- May 7–14 – Despite never making landfall, Typhoon Rammasun's rain bands cause two fatalities in the Philippines.
- May 12 – The MV Nazimuddin sinks in the Ghoratura River in Bangladesh due to a storm, killing at least 44 people.
- May 21–26 – Heavy rain causes floods that kill five people in Chile.
- May 22–27 – A violent EF5 tornado, part of a larger tornado outbreak, tore through the towns of Parkersburg, Iowa, and New Hartford, Iowa, killing 9 people. This would be the first F/EF5 tornado to hit Iowa since the 1976 Jordan tornado.
- May 25 – A tornado and a hailstorm hit Wuchang, Heilongjiang, killing one person and injuring over 30.
- May 26–27 – Mongolia was hit with a heavy snowstorm causing at least 52 fatalities. Large amounts of livestock were killed.
- May 26 – June 14 – Four rounds of flooding impacted parts of China that in total killed over 150 people.
- May 28–29 – Tropical Storm Alma forms off the coast of Costa Rica. Nine people were killed in León, Nicaragua and two people died in Costa Rica.
- May 31 – June 1 – Five fatalities in Belize were directly attributed to Tropical Storm Arthur.

Wildfires in California on July 18

=== June ===
- June – September – Several rounds of monsoon flooding sweep through South and Southeast Asia, with dozens of fatalities reported.
- June 4–11 – Several tornado outbreaks sweep through Central and Eastern North America. One tornado hits a Boy Scout camp, killing 4 people and injuring dozens.
- June 4–13 – Five people are killed by floods caused by heavy rain in Oaxaca, Mexico.
- June 16–18 – Depression BOB 02 forms and makes landfall in Bangladesh. Large amounts of rain were recorded over parts of West Bengal, causing floods that kill over 50 people.
- June 18–25 – Typhoon Fengshen makes two landfalls: one in the Philippines, and another in southern China. Over 1,400 people were killed; 800 of them were on the MV Princess of the Stars when it capsized.
- June 20 – A tornado hits the province of Anhui, China, killing one and injuring nearly 50.
- June 20–21 – A series of dry thunderstorms sweeps across California, causing over 2,000 fires. These fires ended up killing over a dozen firefighters, with some fires burning until September.

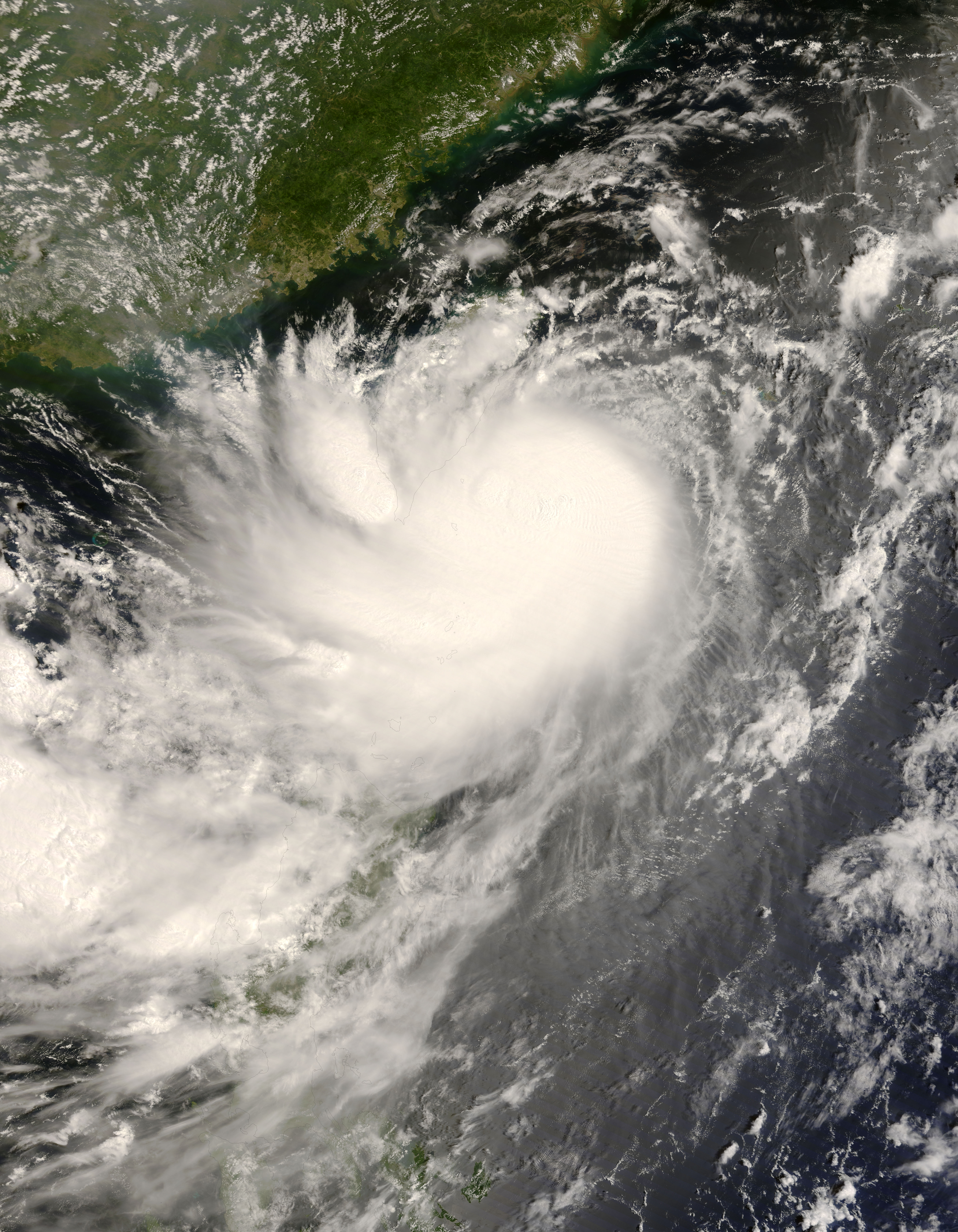
Kalmaegi shortly before being upgraded to a typhoon on July 17

=== July ===
- July 14–18 – Typhoon Kalmaegi made two landfalls in Taiwan and China and enhanced monsoon rains in the Philippines. 25 people were killed.
- July 20–25 – Hurricane Dolly causes massive flooding in Guatemala and makes landfalls in the Yucatán Peninsula and in Texas. 23 fatalities were recorded, 21 of which were in Guatemala.
- July 23–26 – Seven fatalities were reported when floods impacted South Korea.
- July 23 – August 5 – Widespread flooding impacts parts of eastern Europe, killing at least 40 people.
- July 24 – A long-tracked EF2 tornado travels through New Hampshire. One fatality was reported.
- July 25–28 – Typhoon Fung-wong affects several countries in Asia, killing 20 people. Four people were missing.
- July 27–28 – Heavy rain in western Japan causes mudslides and flooding that kills four people.

Hurricane Gustav making landfall on Cuba on August 30

=== August ===
- August 3–4 – A tornado outbreak sweeps through parts of Europe. An F4 tornado kills three people in France.
- August 3–6 – Tropical Storm Edouard makes landfall along the Texas coast, killing one person.
- August 3–8 – Tropical Storm Kammuri causes 127 deaths in Vietnam.
- August 4–5 – 27 people were killed, most in North-West Frontier Province, in floods in India and Pakistan.
- August 4–5 – Severe storms sweep through the Midwest United States, killing two people.
- August 9–10 – A depression passes through parts of India, killing over 60 people.
- August 15–23 – Tropical Storm Fay impacts the Caribbean and the southwest United States, making four landfalls in Florida. A total of 36 deaths were reported.
- August 18–22 – Typhoon Nuri makes landfall in the Philippines and Hong Kong, killing at least ten people.
- August 25 – September 4 – Hurricane Gustav wreaks havoc on the Caribbean, making three landfalls. Over 150 people were killed, about half of which were in Haiti.
- August 28 – September 7 – Hurricane Hanna causes massive floods that kill at least 537 people, most in Haiti.
- August 29 – Floods in Japan kill one person.
- August 31 – Heavy rain and floods impact parts of southern Chile. Four deaths were reported.

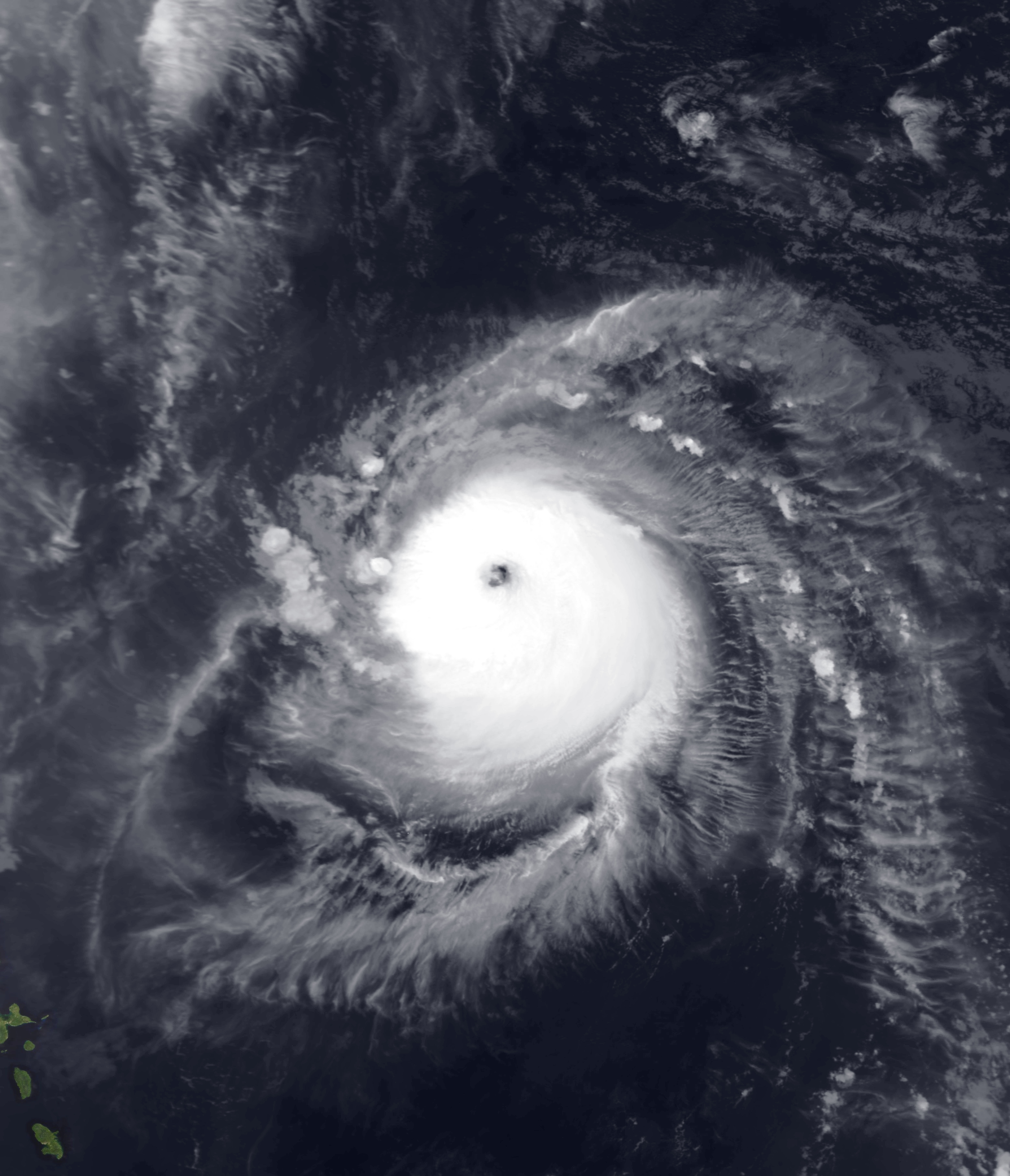
Hurricane Ike near peak intensity on September 4

=== September ===
- September 1–14 – Hurricane Ike tracked through parts of the Caribbean and along parts of the Gulf Coast. In total, nearly 200 fatalities were reported.
- September 3 – A tornado associated with Hurricane Gustav kills two people.
- September 6–8 – Six people were reported dead when floods impacted the United Kingdom.
- September 8 – A major mudslide was caused by the failure of a retaining wall due to heavy rains, inundating a village and killing 277 people.
- September 8–21 – Typhoon Sinlaku kills at least 14 people in Taiwan.
- September 15–19 – Deep Depression BOB 04 causes floods that kill 25 people in Odisha and Uttar Pradesh.
- September 18–25 – Typhoon Hagupit impacts large parts of South and Southeast Asia, killing at least 93 people.
- September 21–23 – The precursor to Hurricane Kyle dumps torrential rainfall on Puerto Rico, killing six people (three direct and three indirect).
- September 23 – October 1 – Typhoon Jangmi kills two people in Taiwan and four in Japan.
- September 27–30 – Tropical Storm Mekkhala impacts Vietnam. Eight people were killed and another eight were missing.

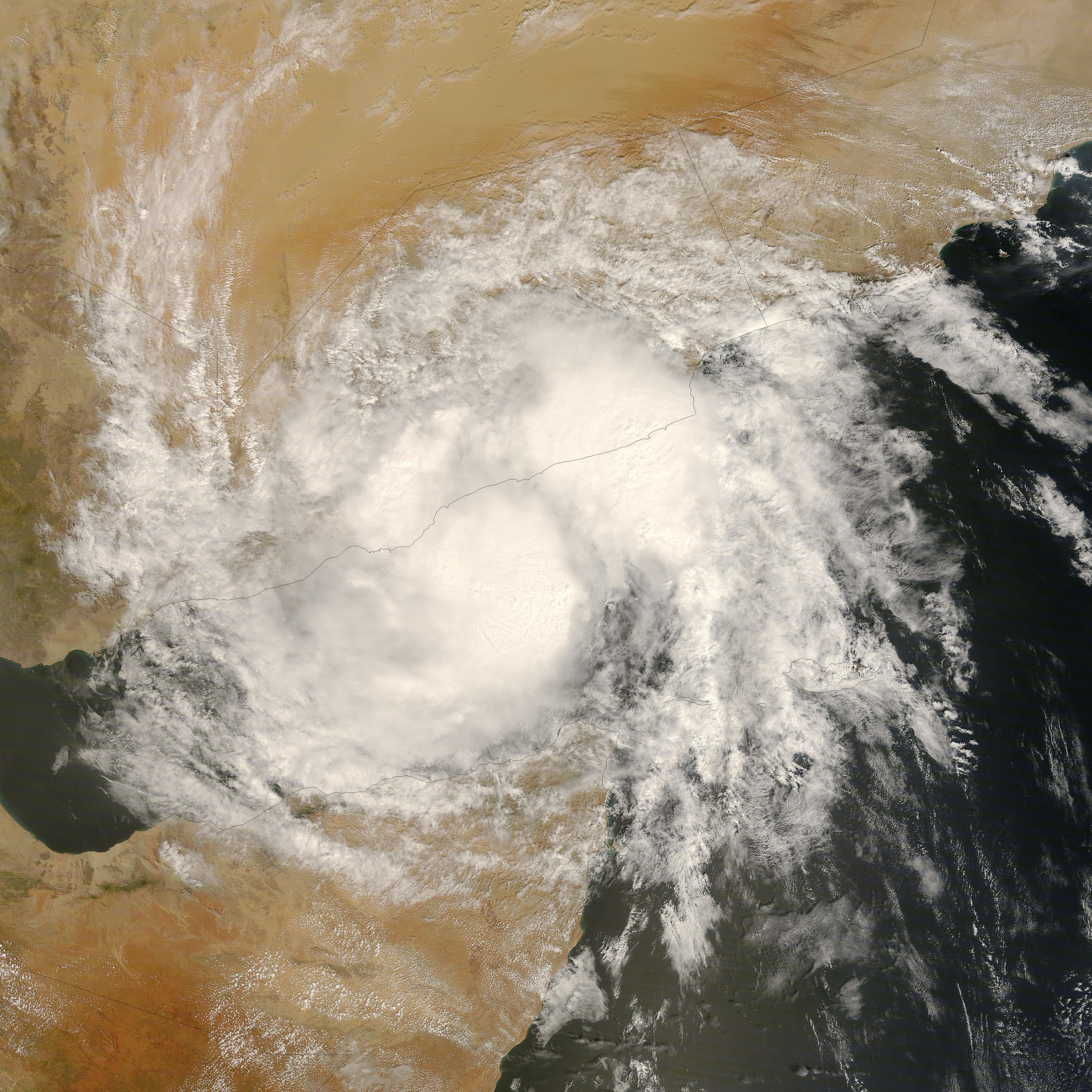
Deep Depression ARB 02

=== October ===
- October – The October 2008 Central America floods kill over 100 people.
- October 2 – Flash floods in Algeria caused by heavy rain kills 89 people.
- October 3–12 – Hurricane Norbert makes two landfalls in Mexico, resulting in 25 confirmed fatalities.
- October 13–18 – Hurricane Omar kills one person in Puerto Rico.
- October 16–24 – Tropical Storm Asma kills one person.
- October 20–30 – Flash flooding in Morocco results in 28 fatalities. 200 mud-brick houses were destroyed.
- October 23 – Deep Depression ARB 02 makes landfall in Yemen, causing heavy rain that results in 180 deaths.
- October 26–27 – Cyclone Rashmi kills 15 people in Bangladesh, with 50 people gone missing.
- October 26–30 – A blizzard in Tibet dumps nearly 25 inches of snow, with six people reported dead.
- October 30 – November 4 – Flooding impacts Vietnam and China, resulting in a total of 100 deaths.

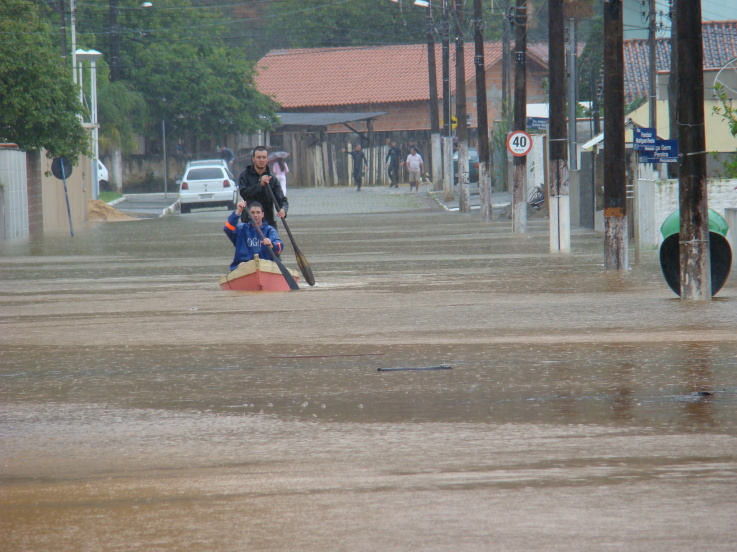
Flooding in the city of Itajaí in Santa Catarina

=== November ===
- November ? – After a river in Ethiopia bursts its banks, severe flooding occurs, killing at least 11 people.
- November 4–9 – One fatality was reported from floods caused by Hurricane Paloma.
- November 6–14 – Tropical Storm Maysak kills at least 24 people in the Philippines and Vietnam.
- November 9–16 – Heavy rain falls across parts of South Africa, causing flooding that kills at least five people.
- November 14–17 – Tropical Storm Noul drops heavy rain that kills 21 people in Vietnam.
- November 15 – A strong line of thunderstorms southeast of Raleigh, North Carolina produces five tornadoes. Two people were killed.
- November 20–23 – Heavy rains sets off landslides and flooding in Venezuela that kill nine people.
- November 22 – Panama experiences flooding that kills ten people.
- November 22–24 – 128 people are killed after heavy rain causes floods in parts of Brazil, particularly in Santa Catarina.
- November 25–29 – Cyclone Nisha caused floods in Sri Lanka and India, killing over 200 people.
- Late November – Sri Lanka is pounded by heavy rain, causing floods that kill at least seven people.

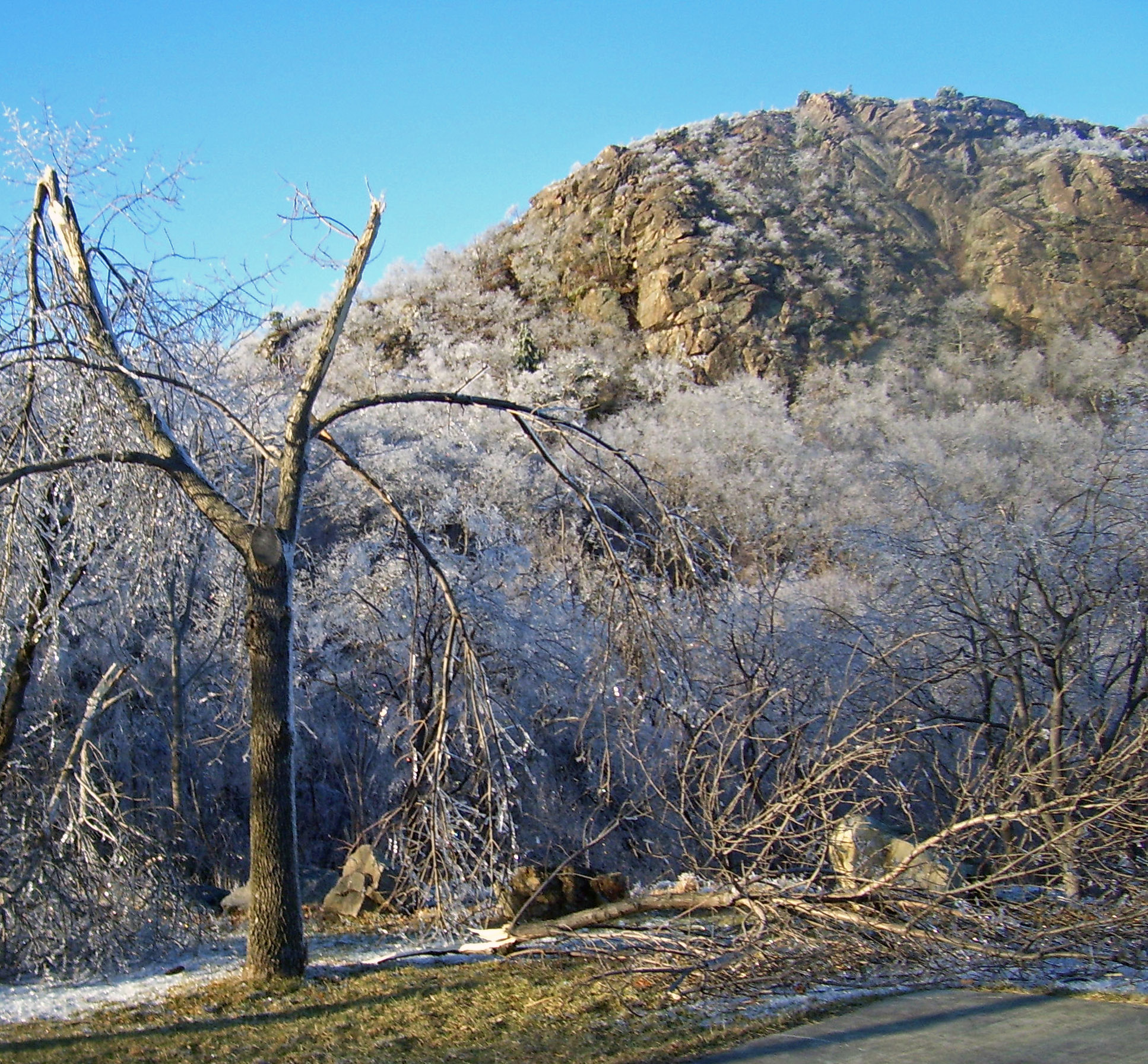
Tree damage from an ice storm at the Storm King Mountain trailhead in Cornwall, New York

=== December ===
- December 8 – Ten people were killed when floods hit part of the Philippines.
- December 11–15 – Floods impact part of Rome, with four fatalities reported.
- December 12 – Four people were killed when an ice storm impacts the Northeastern United States.
- December 15–16 – Heavy rain falls on the island of Mallorca, causing a hotel collapse that kills four people.
- December 28 – An avalanche occurred following heavy snow in British Columbia, killing eight people.

== See also ==
- 2008 in the environment
- Weather of 2007
- 2008

Global weather by year
Preceded by 2007	Weather of 2008	Succeeded by 2009
