= North American blizzard of 2008 =

Weather event in the United States and Canada

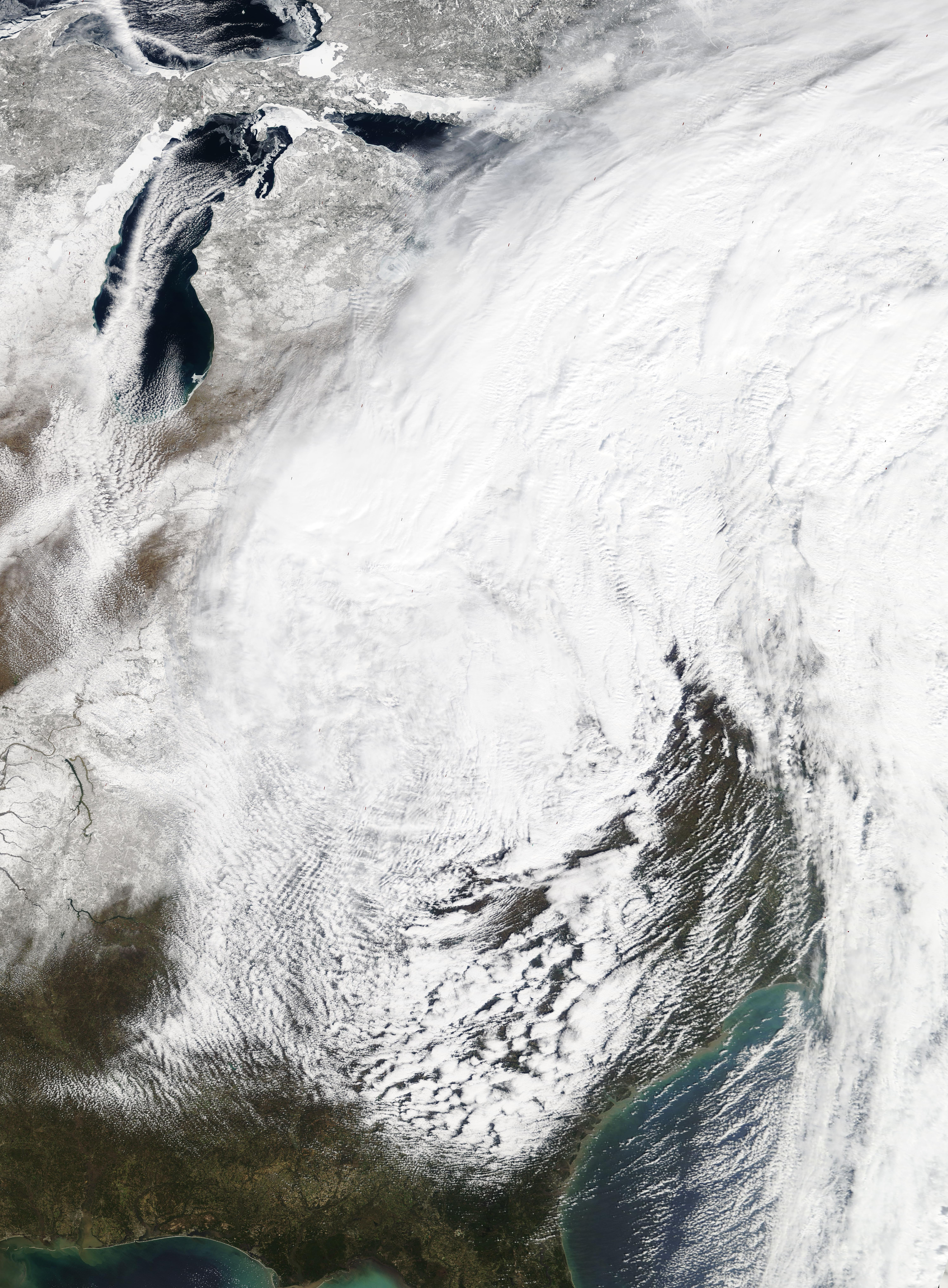
- The extratropical cyclone responsible for the blizzard over the U.S. Midwest on March 8

Meteorological history
- Formed: March 6, 2008
- Dissipated: March 10, 2008

Blizzard
- Lowest pressure: 984 millibars (29.1 inHg)
- Max. snowfall: 28.5 in (720 mm) of snow in Madison, Ohio

Tornado outbreak
- Tornadoes: 13
- Max. rating: EF2 tornado

Overall effects
- Fatalities: at least 13 direct, 4 indirect
- Damage: $789 million
- Areas affected: Southern and Eastern North America
- Power outages: 278,700
- Part of the 2007–08 North American winter and Tornadoes of 2008

The North American blizzard of 2008 was a winter storm that struck most of southern and eastern North America from March 6 to March 10, 2008. The storm was most notable for a major winter storm event from Arkansas to Quebec. It also produced severe weather across the east coast of the United States with heavy rain, damaging winds and tornadoes, causing locally significant damage. The hardest hit areas by the wintry weather were from the Ohio Valley to southern Quebec where up to a half a meter of snow fell locally including the major cities of Columbus, Ohio, Cleveland, Ohio, and Ottawa, Ontario. For many areas across portions of the central United States, Ontario and Quebec, it was the worst winter storm in the past several years. The blizzard and its aftermath caused at least 17 deaths across four US states and three Canadian provinces, while hundreds others were injured mostly in weather-related accidents and tornadoes.

== Meteorological synopsis and event ==
=== March 6 ===
During the day, a low pressure system developed across Texas and rain gradually turned into snow in parts of Oklahoma and northern Texas giving locally a few inches of snow particularly just east of Oklahoma City. Across southern Texas, an EF1 tornado touched down near the Corpus Christi region.

=== March 7 ===
From Texas north and east through Ohio, heavy snow fell. According to The Weather Channel and the National Weather Service, Dallas and Fort Worth received anywhere from 1-inch (25 mm) to 6 inches (150 mm). Sherman, Texas received 9 inches (230 mm), while Collinsville, TX got 8 inches (20 cm). Cincinnati, Ohio received 7 inches (18 cm) which broke the daily snowfall record for March 7. The Memphis metropolitan area received anywhere from 3 inches (76 mm) in Lakeland, Tennessee to 7.2 inches (180 mm) at the NWS office in East Memphis, with the Memphis International Airport picking up 5.4 inches (140 mm), its heaviest snowfall in 20 years. In Arkansas, some areas received locally up to one foot (30 cm) of snow.

In Florida, several tornadoes hit the Jacksonville area, as well as in parts of Georgia. The Storm Prediction Center said one person was injured and two were killed. In total, 17 tornadoes were reported during the outbreak across the two states including duplicated reports and at least thirteen were confirmed including five EF1's and three EF2's.

== Tornadoes confirmed ==
Confirmed tornadoes by Enhanced Fujita rating
EFU	EF0	EF1	EF2	EF3	EF4	EF5	Total
0	5	5	3	0	0	0	13

Tornado event - March 6–7, 2008
EF#	Location	County	Time (CST)	Path length	Damage
Texas
EF1	N of Gardendale	Nueces	2058 (03/06)	unknown	Sporadic damage to homes and trees
Florida
EF1	Capitola	Leon	1225	5 miles (8 km)	8 houses were heavily damaged and 1 person was injured
EF2	Keaton Beach	Taylor	1336	unknown	One home destroyed and 15 others damaged including several decks that failed. Boats were lofted in the air. Two people were injured.
EF0	S of Wellborn	Suwannee	1430	unknown	An old shed blew off trees
EF2	Lake City	Columbia	1445	2 miles (3.2 km)	1 death Significant damage confirmed by NWS survey including buildings, mobile homes and overturned vehicles. Nineteen homes were destroyed and 41 others suffered damage. Five people were also injured. One person died as a direct result of this tornado when a tree entered her mobile home. Another person died while trying to connect a power generator.
EF2	SE of Taylor	Baker	1510	1 mile (1.6 km)	A residence was destroyed and tin was removed from another. One person was injured
EF0	NW of Kent	Nassau	1530	unknown	Minor damage to outhouse and trees
Georgia
EF1	SW of Clarking	Charlton	1520	6 miles (9.6 km)	5 homes sustained damage including one with major structural damage
EF1	SW of Mount Pleasant	Wayne	1520	1 mile (1.6 km)	Garages were damaged and hundreds of trees were downed
EF0	NW of Lulaton	Brantley	1527	unknown	Damage to one home
EF0	N of Bellevue Point	McIntosh	1557	unknown	Brief tornado touchdown
EF0	E of St. Marys	Camden	1630	1 mile (1.6 km)	Waterspout reported
EF1	NW of Chapel Hill	Douglas	0025	7 miles (11.2 km)	Several homes sustained varying degrees of damage. A Kroger grocery store also sustained roof damage. One mobile home and one site-built home were destroyed while 10 homes and one business had major damage and 52 homes and one business had minor damage. Numerous trees were snapped or blown down and fences were also downed.
Sources: Storm Reports for March 6, 2008, Storm Reports for March 7, 2008, NWS Tallahassee, Florida, NWS Jacksonville, Florida (slideshow for Columbia County tornado)

=== March 8–9 ===
Rainfall as a result of the storm in Chester County, Pennsylvania on March 8

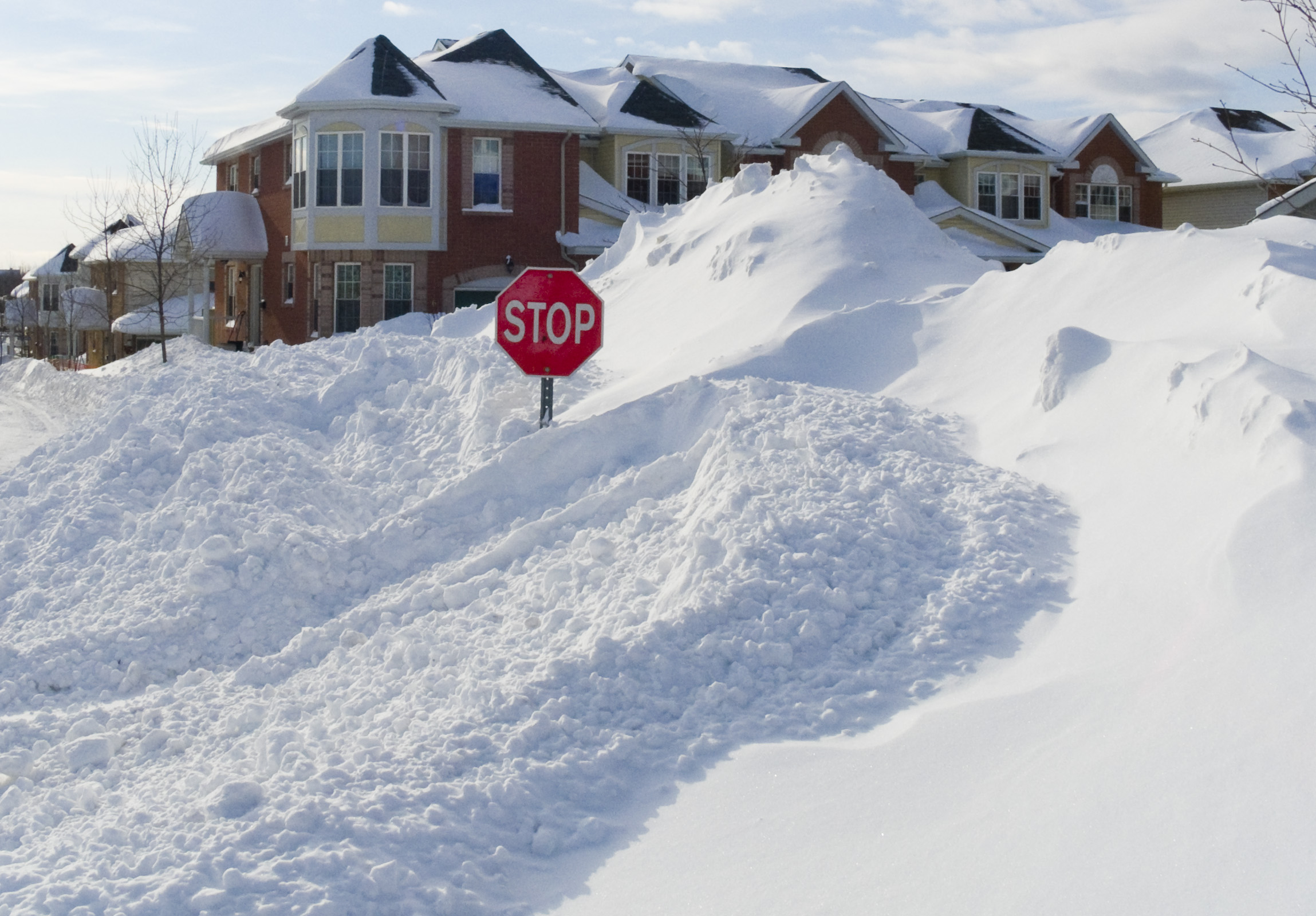
The accumulation of snow in Ottawa, Ontario dwarfs a stop sign on March 9

As of 9 am, Cincinnati had received 9 inches (23 cm) of snow. Louisville, Kentucky reported 11 inches (28 cm) of snow, while Columbus, Ohio got 9.5 inches (24 cm). Several Ohio locations reported thundersnow early Saturday morning. Parts of Indiana, Kentucky and Ohio were under Blizzard Warnings.

As the snow wound down Saturday night, snowfall totals were over 20 inches (51 cm) for parts of central Ohio, with most areas of Ohio reporting over 10 inches (25 cm). Port Columbus reported total snowfall of 20.4 in (51.8 cm), the most ever recorded for central Ohio. Large sections of Ohio including the Dayton and Cincinnati areas were under snow emergencies. Five to seven inches (13 to 18 cm) fell across Mississippi with over one foot (30 cm) of snow in parts of Kentucky (including Louisville) and Tennessee. Residents reported in Leitchfield, KY that snow accumulated to 6–8 inches (15–20 cm), with 10 in (25 cm) at most in rural areas. For portions of Middle Tennessee, it was the worst snowstorm since 2003. Humphreys and Perry Counties along the Tennessee River both exceeded 8 inches (20 cm) of snow while portions of the Nashville area received 6 inches (150 mm); its biggest snowfall since March 19, 1996, where 9 inches (23 cm) fell. A large area of Tennessee affected by the winter storm were hit by several strong and deadly tornadoes just over one month earlier on February 5.

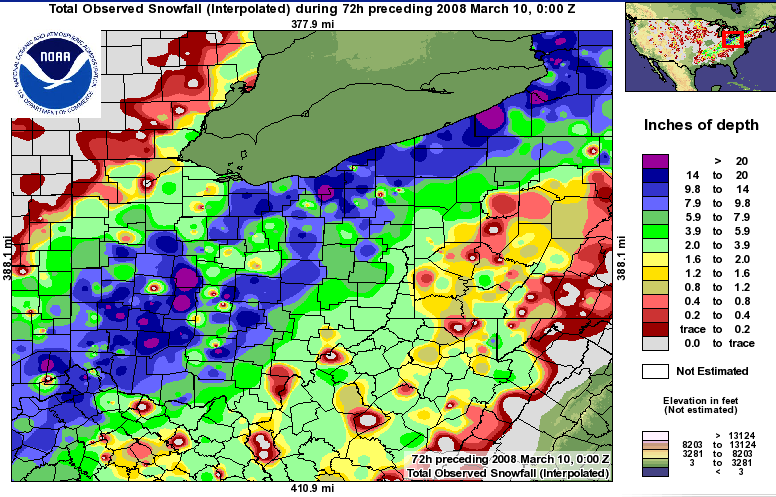
North American blizzard of 2008 snowfall accumulation for the Ohio River Valley.(From the National Weather Service)

In southern Ontario, some areas especially near the Niagara Peninsula received in excess of 50 centimetres (20 in) of snow. Some areas in southeastern Ontario and southern Quebec saw in excess of 50 cm (20 in) of snow with Ottawa receiving the highest amount with 48 cm (19 in). Several areas across Ontario reported thundersnow with locally ice pellets and freezing rain closer to the Highway 401 corridor The storm also affected much of Atlantic Canada and New England with extensive freezing rain across most of New Brunswick although northern sections of the province received from 25 to 50 centimetres (9.8 to 19.7 in) in Campbellton. Heavy snow fell on some areas that already had close-to-record-breaking amounts of snow for that winter.

Parts of Nova Scotia, southern New Brunswick, Newfoundland and Labrador, Prince Edward Island and most of the Interstate 95 corridor along the Eastern Seaboard of the United States from the Carolinas to Maine also saw heavy rain while strong winds also accompanied the precipitation particularly along the eastern US where the winds were also accompanied by damaging wind causing localized damage to mostly trees, power lines and some structures including in the Philadelphia and Washington D.C. regions. About 80 millimetres (3.1 in) of rain fell over Saint John, New Brunswick causing localized street and basement flooding. The system departed the continent and over the Atlantic Ocean on March 10 and crossed just west of the British Isles causing strong winds across Ireland, the United Kingdom and parts of western Europe.

== Impact ==
Snowfall amounts of the March 7–9 storm
City	Snowfall accumulated
Ottawa, ON	48 cm (19 in)
Lancaster, OH	46 cm (18 in)
Columbus, OH	51 cm (20 in)
St. Catharines, ON	50 cm (20 in)
Quebec City, QC	30–42 cm (12–17 in)
Cincinnati, OH	25–41 cm (10–16 in) (region)
Cleveland, OH	38 cm (15 in)
Dayton, OH	33 cm (13 in)
Montreal, QC	32 cm (13 in)
Louisville, KY	28 cm (11 in)
Toronto, ON	15–32 cm (6–13 in) (region) 15 cm (6 in) Pearson Airport
Memphis, TN	13–18 cm (5–7 in)
All amounts are snowfall only

=== Incidents ===
At Port Columbus International Airport, an airplane skidded off the runway after landing, but nobody was injured. In Cambridge, Ontario, 6 people were injured after a smoking canopy collapsed due to the snow. In Quebec, due to the heavy weight of the snow and/or the damaging wind gusts, several structures collapsed or were damaged in the Mauricie, Centre-du-Québec and Quebec City regions as well as in eastern Ontario although there were no injuries. A few days later during the aftermath of the snowstorm in Morin-Heights, Quebec, the heavy snow cover was responsible for a roof collapse at a factory that killed 3 people. A fourth person died on March 16 from a collapsed house in Shawinigan, north of Trois-Rivières, while saving three family members.

Several schools in the Montreal area, mostly from its largest school board the Commission scolaire de Montréal, were closed later in the week in order to clear snow from the roofs due to concerns about possible collapses of the structures forcing the evacuation of thousands of elementary school students into nearby arenas, community centers or churches. In Chelsea, Quebec, two elementary schools were also evacuated after a custodian worker discovered cracks on a ceiling and a malfunctioned sliding door possibly due to the weight of the snow. Students were moved into a village church. The four high schools of the Commission Scolaire des Draveurs, the Cégep de l'Outaouais and the Université du Québec en Outaouais in Gatineau as well as Rockland District High School in Rockland and Sir Wilfrid Laurier Secondary School in Ottawa were shut down for a few days for precautionary reasons and for roof snow removal operations. Numerous other structures were also evacuated throughout the week including parts of the Pratt & Whitney plant in Longueuil for similar reasons. Three other homes, one in the Westboro area of Ottawa, one in La Pêche and the other in the Beauce region, also had their roofs collapsed or split because of the snow. At Ottawa's Dow's Lake, an historical landmark used by army and reservists was damaged beyond repair forcing it to be torn down.

=== Event/school cancellations ===
The University of Cincinnati's men's basketball team were unable to depart from Cincinnati from its game against Connecticut which forced its postponement. Many sporting events across the Buckeye State were canceled. The University of Louisville also canceled classes on Saturday as did Ryerson University, and several colleges in Toronto also on Saturday and Quebec City's Université Laval on Sunday. All major school districts in the Columbus area were closed until Monday as did several schools in Quebec while school in Ontario were closed because of the annual March week break.

=== Power outages ===
About 87,000 Hydro-Québec customers lost power during the peak of the storm with the Quebec City region being the hardest hit area in Quebec, where winds were gusting in excess of 100 km/h with the highest being 133 km/h. 4 000 customers in New Brunswick, 2500 in Prince Edward Island and 5000 in Nova Scotia were without power because of the winds and heavy ice. In the US, 2,000 lost power in Vermont due to the winter storm while 80,000 customers in Pennsylvania and 100,000 customers in New Jersey also lost electricity due to the severe weather and high winds.

=== Flight and travel disruptions ===
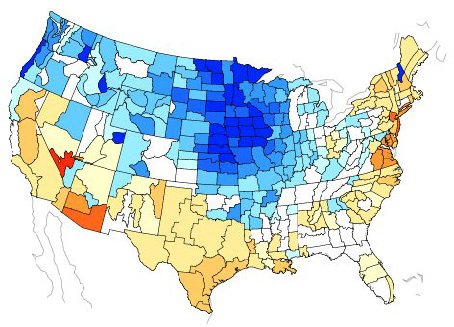
Annual temperature departures for the year 2008. 2008 was the coldest year since 1994 in the United States.

Hundreds of flights in and out of Montréal–Pierre Elliott Trudeau International Airport (400 flights) in Montreal, Pearson International Airport in Toronto and Macdonald-Cartier International Airport in Ottawa where canceled. The snowstorm hit during the end of the March school break week in Quebec and the start of it in Ontario. Due to a larger number of travelers, the storm caused a major backlog at all airports where numerous passengers were stranded and cots were also distributed to passengers at the Ottawa Airport. At the same airport, nearly 300 passengers were stranded inside two Air Cubana planes for 12 hours without water and food and disabled bathrooms before returning to the plane's initial destination in Montreal. Some of the passengers had even called for emergency vehicles due to the conditions inside the plane In addition to cancelled flights in Canada, 250 flights were canceled from Cleveland's Hopkins International Airport and was shut down for most of Saturday. About 90 percent of the flights from Port Columbus International Airport were canceled as well as several other flights elsewhere across the Midwest.

In many cities, ground transportation was also disrupted. In Ottawa, the O-Train Trillium Line was shut down for most of the day and there was significantly reduced service on local, cross-town and Transitway routes. Via Rail train service was also reduced including canceled trips during the peak of the storm on March 8 as did several off-town bus trips. The Line 3 Scarborough in the Toronto region was also completely shut down on Saturday while TTC service and GO Transit were heavily slowed down.

=== Road closures ===
In Quebec, several major highways were closed including Highway 175 between Quebec City and Saguenay as well as Autoroutes 15, 20, 30 and 40 north and east of Montreal. Several other highways in eastern Quebec including Highways 132 and 138 in the Bas-Saint-Laurent and Charlevoix regions east of Quebec City In Ontario portions of Highway 17, 400 and 401 were shut down. In the Quebec City region, about 80 vehicles were stuck and abandoned across a secondary highway due to blowing snow and high snow drifts. East of Montreal, a 20-car pile-up west of Lavaltrie injured 10 people. Numerous other motorists while been stuck on highways were also forced to abandon their vehicles, particularly on Highways 15 and 30 north of Laval and between Brossard and Varennes

About 900 accidents were reported in Ontario provincial highways by Ontario Provincial Police including 450 across Eastern Ontario, while the Toronto Police Service reported over 1700 collisions during the weekend. In the Niagara region, a tour bus carrying 17 people tipped over into a ditch although there was no known word on any injuries in this incident. In Ohio, according to the State Highway Patrol, nearly 2 000 crashes occurred throughout the state, including one fatal one and 190 others which resulted in injuries.

=== Fatalities ===
In addition to the two roof collapse incidents that killed 4 in Quebec on March 12 and March 16, the storm was responsible for at least 4 fatalities in Ohio from heart-related issues from snow-shoveling. 5 people, including two in New York, one in Ohio, one in Tennessee and one in Ontario were killed as a result of traffic accidents. 2 people were killed by a tornado in Florida as severe weather hit many areas of the coastal states from Florida to New Jersey. An 8-year-old boy in New Brunswick was killed after the storm as a result of the collapse of a snow tunnel. In Ontario, one man died from hypothermia after being stuck in the snow two days after the storm in Stormont, Dundas and Glengary County

== Gallery ==
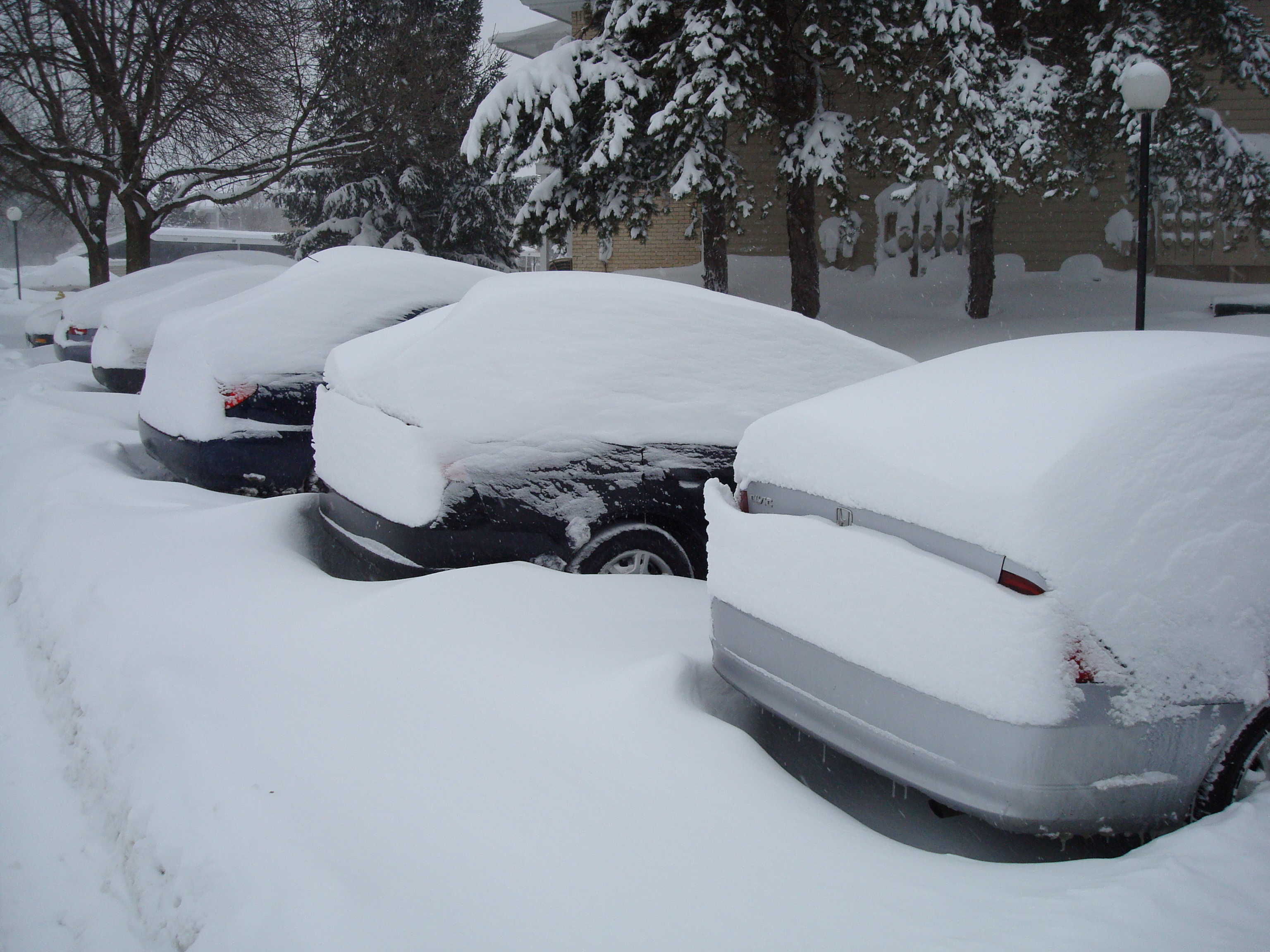
Cars were completely covered in Columbus, Ohio

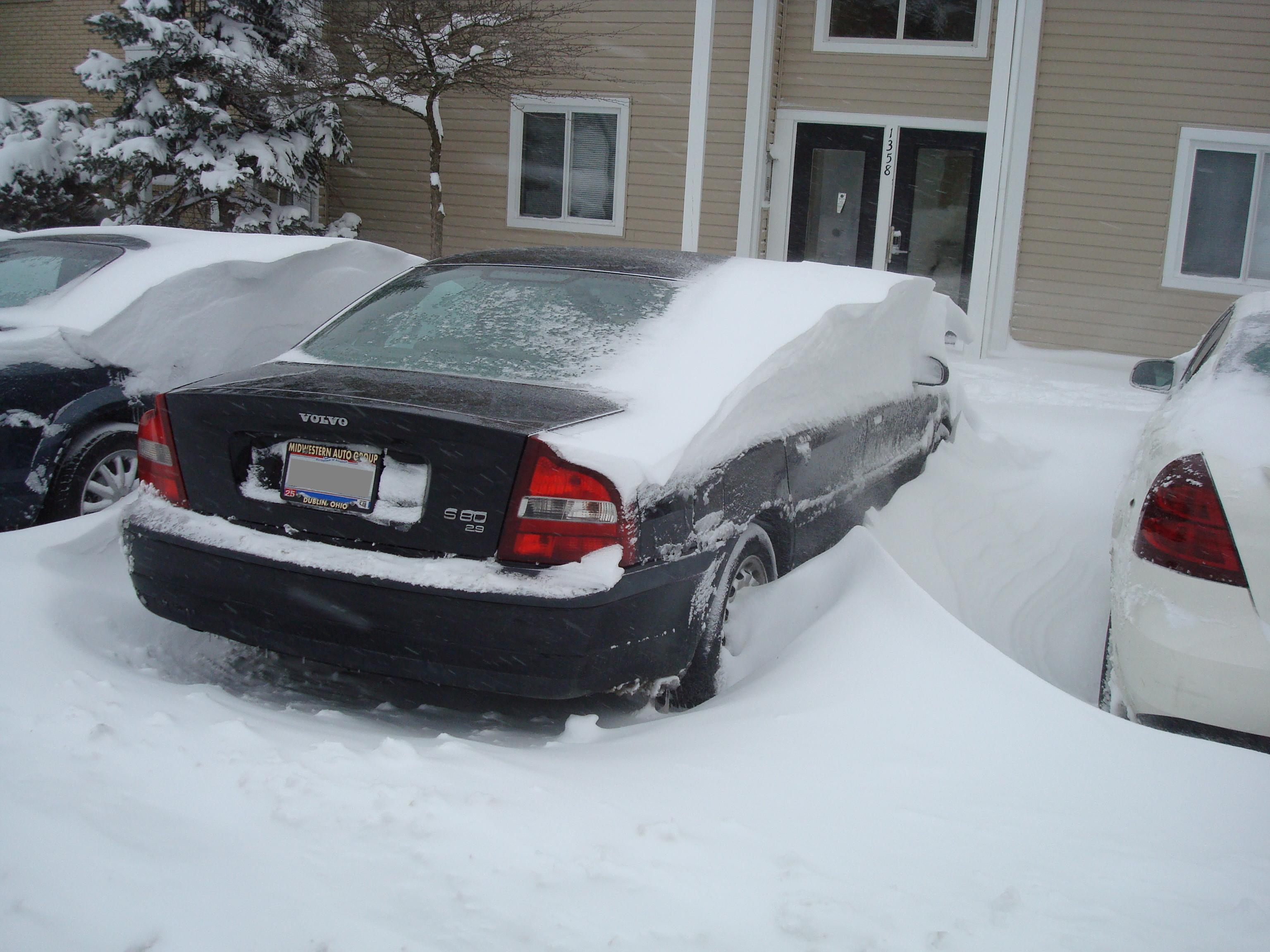
Drifting and blowing snow made unusual formations

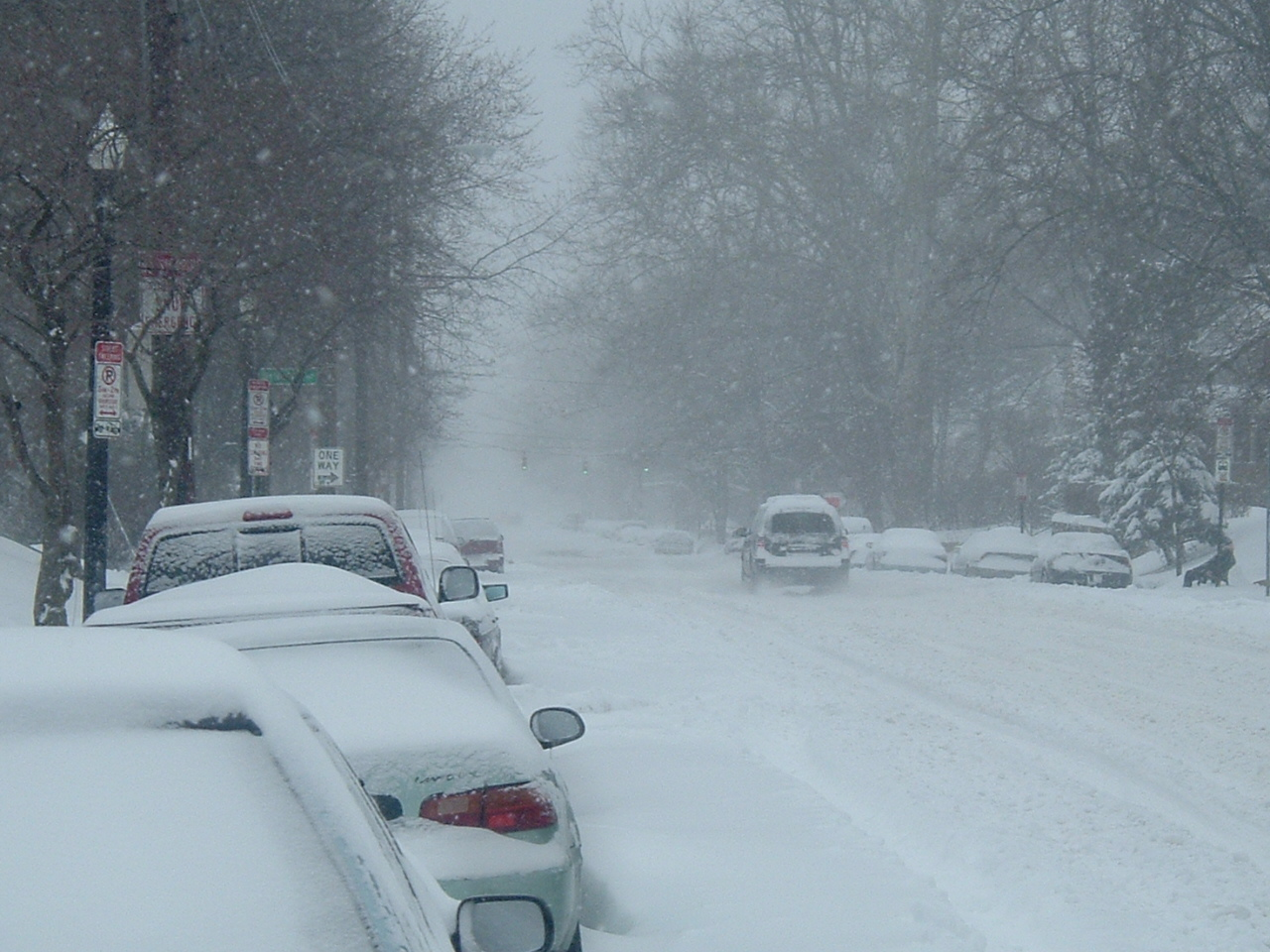
While seeing the Columbus skyline down Summit Street is usually easy, visibility made things difficult for area residents.

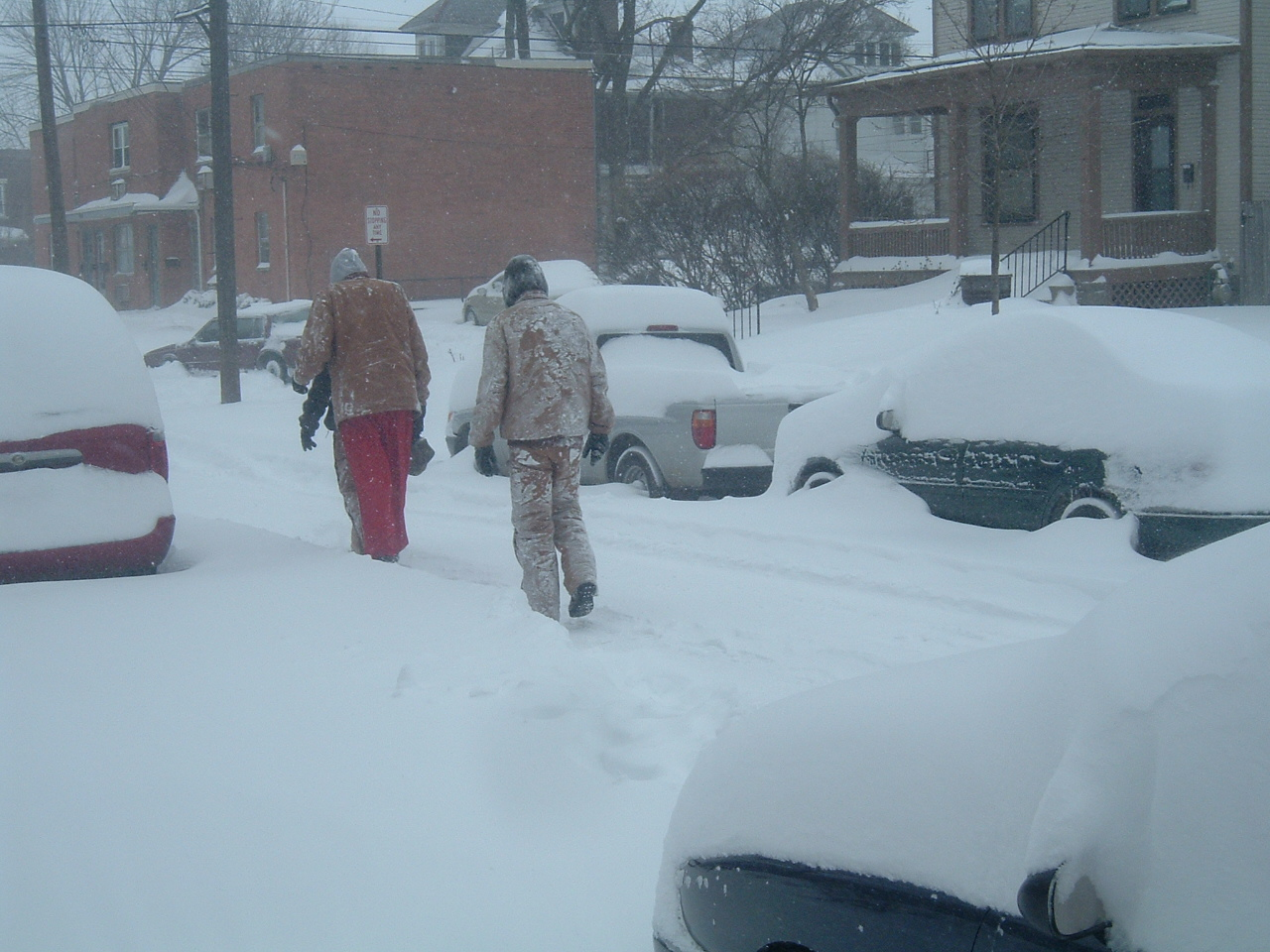
Two Columbus residents walk down Alden Avenue in Columbus due to the 3+ feet snowdrifts that covered the sidewalks.

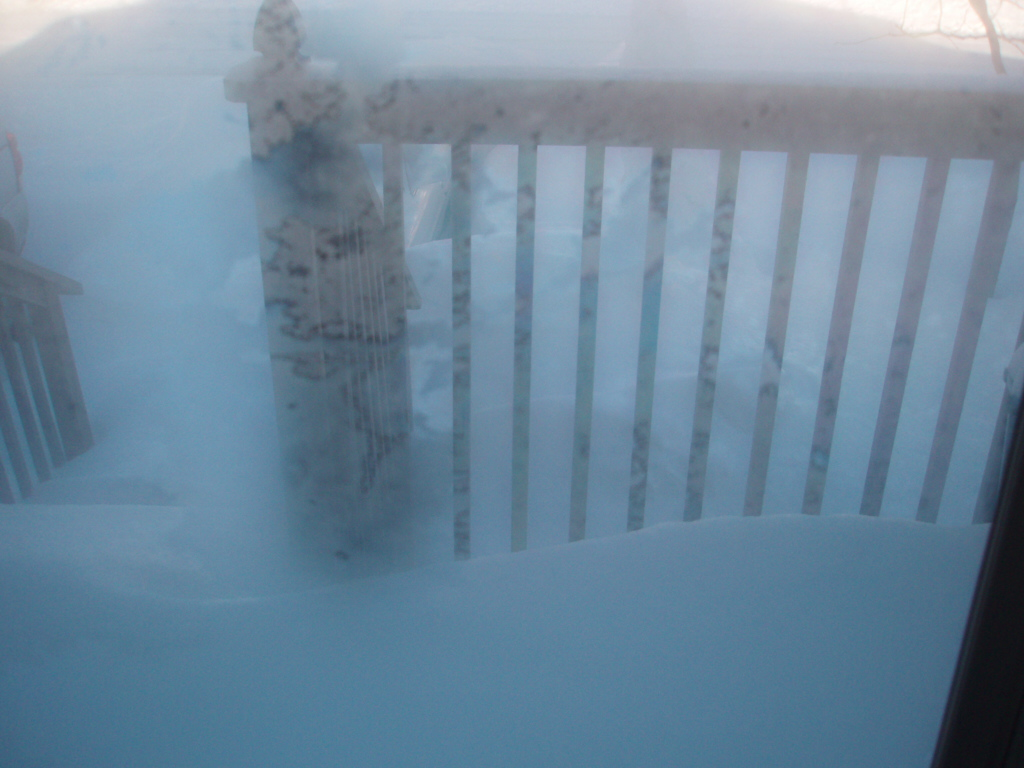
Snowdrifts burying a deck in southern Ontario after the storm, taken on the morning of March 9, 2008, after the storm.

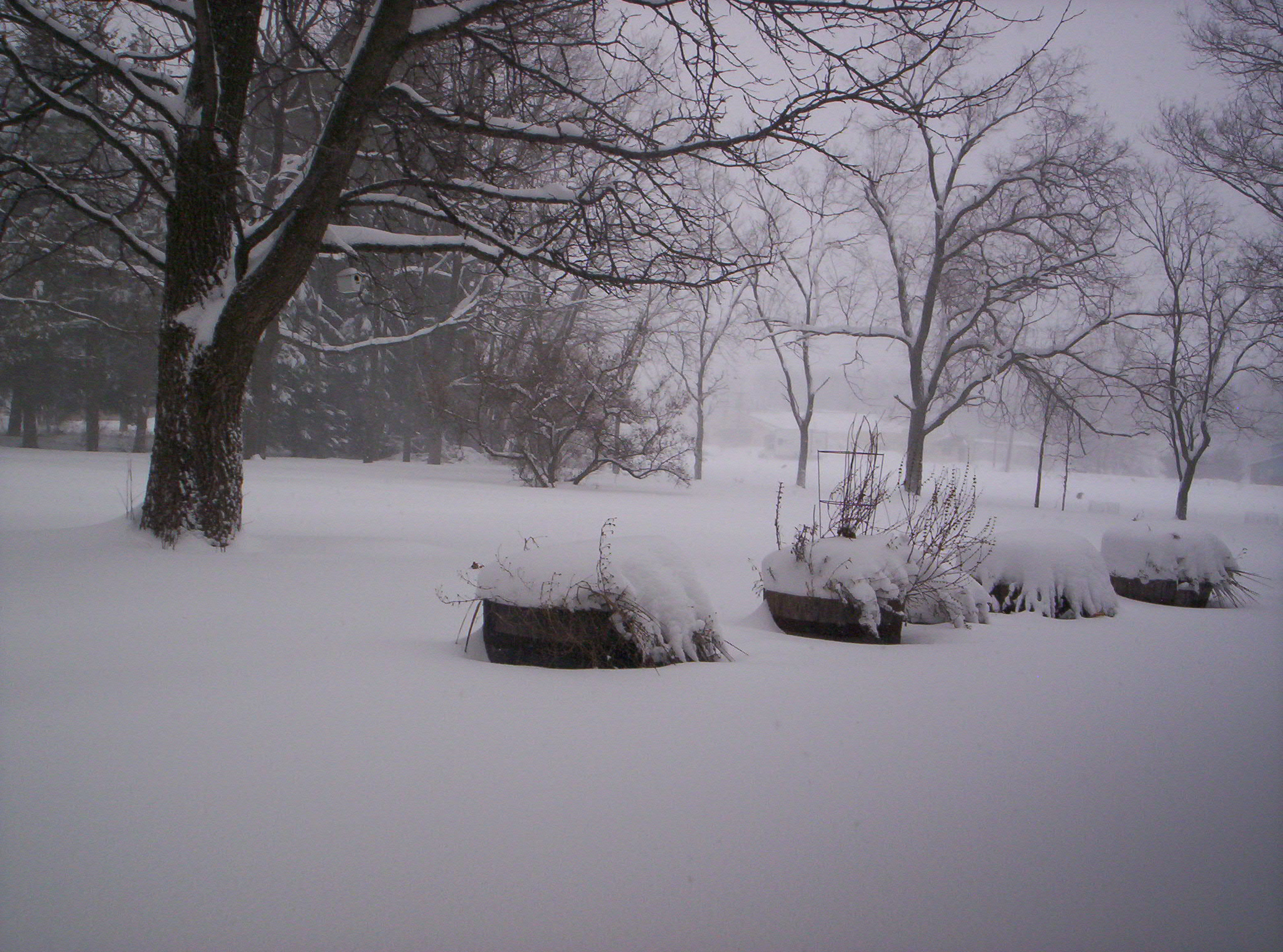
Mansfield, Ohio paralyzed by snow and blowing snow saw a storm total of 19.7 in (50.0 cm) on March 7–8, 2008.

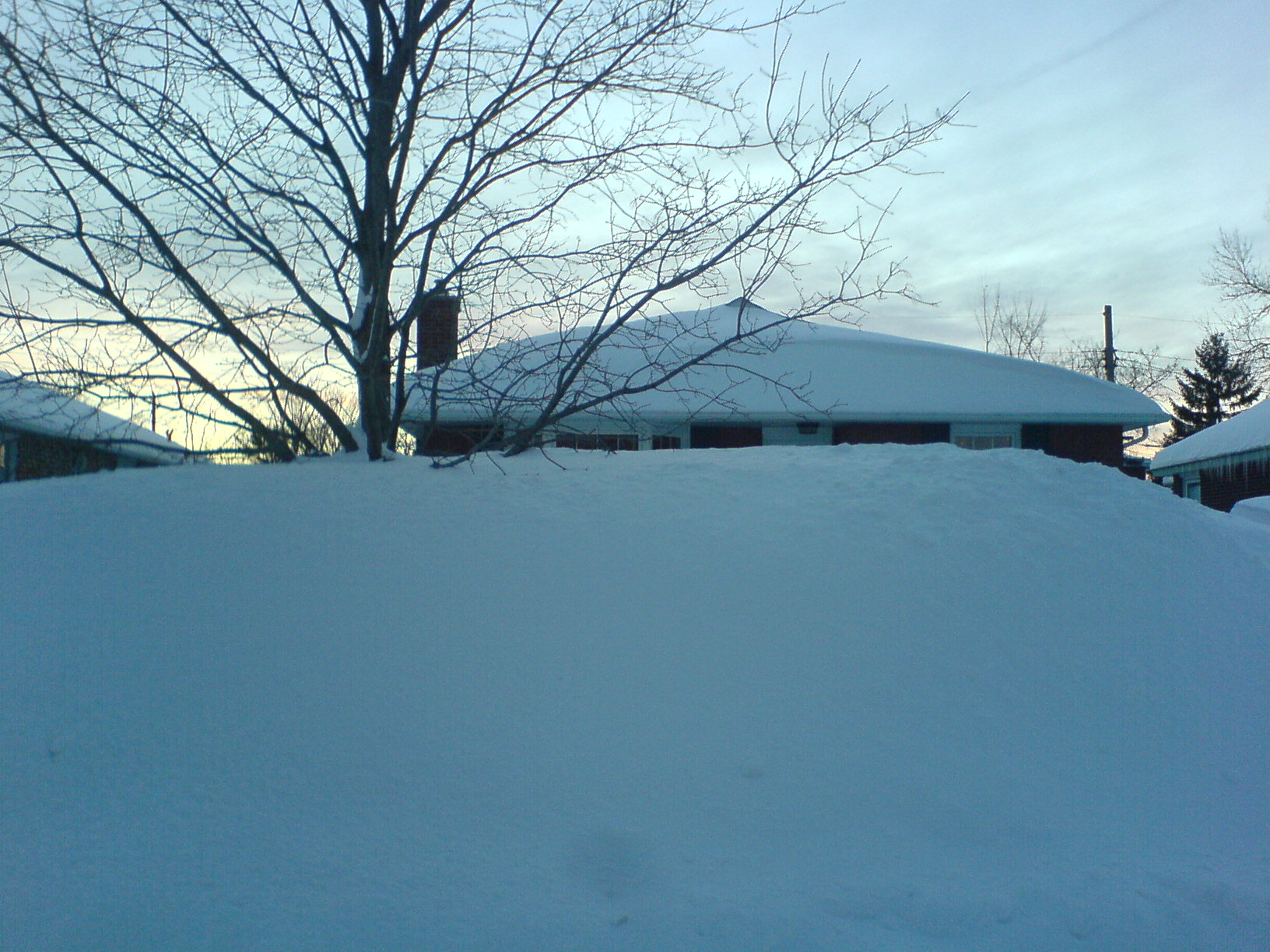
A massive snow drift in front of a house in Ottawa, Ontario on March 9, 2008.

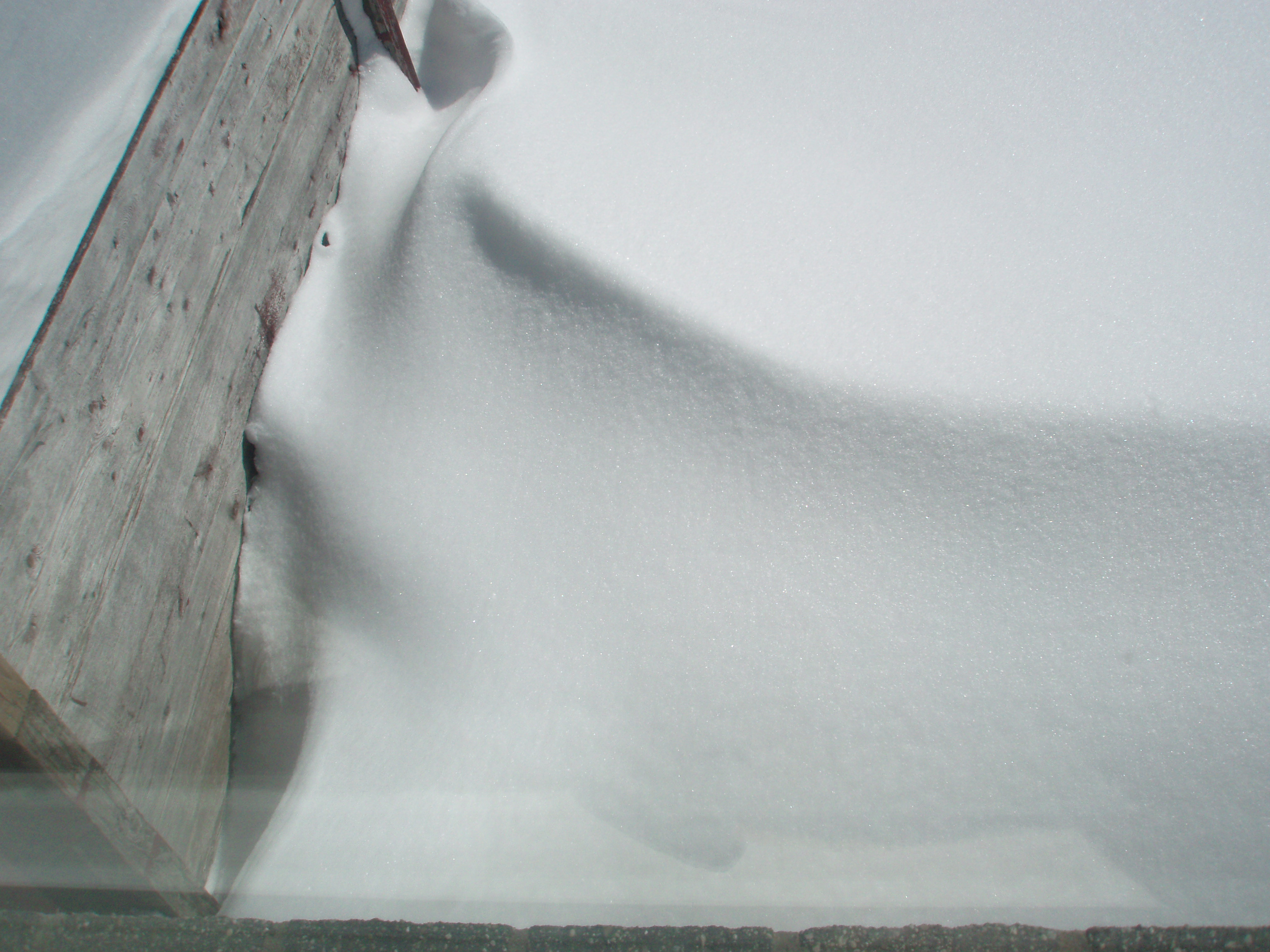
Snowdrifts blown by the wind during the storm left in a backyard in southern Ontario after the storm.

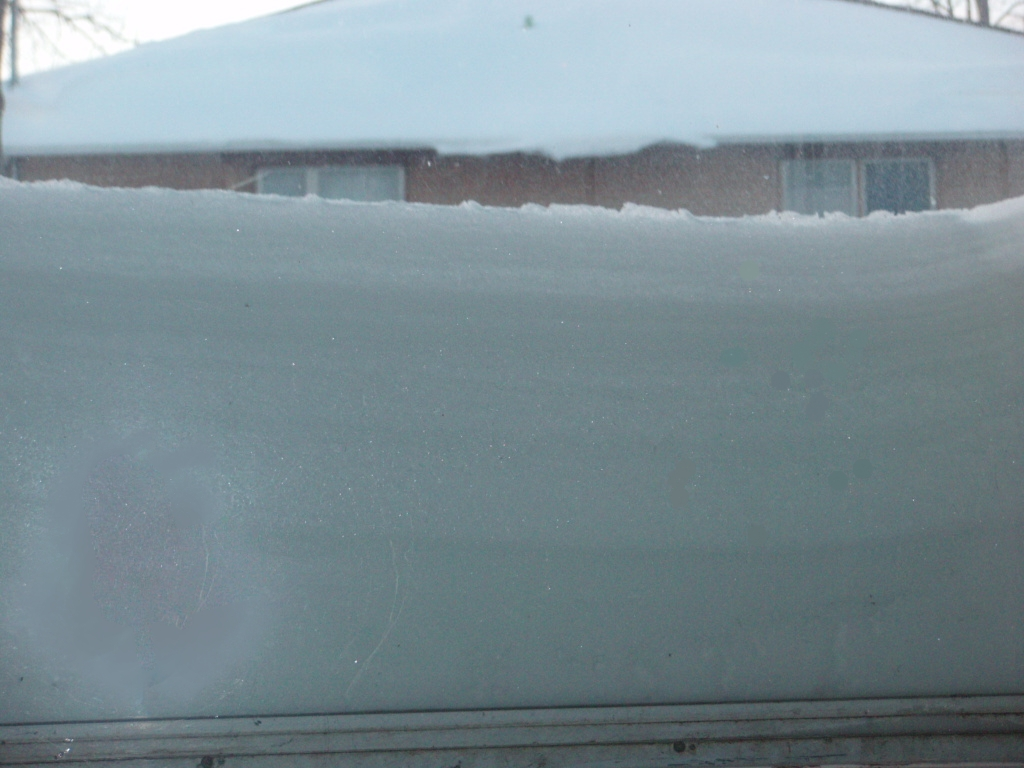
Layers of snow deposited over time after the storm hit southern Ontario.

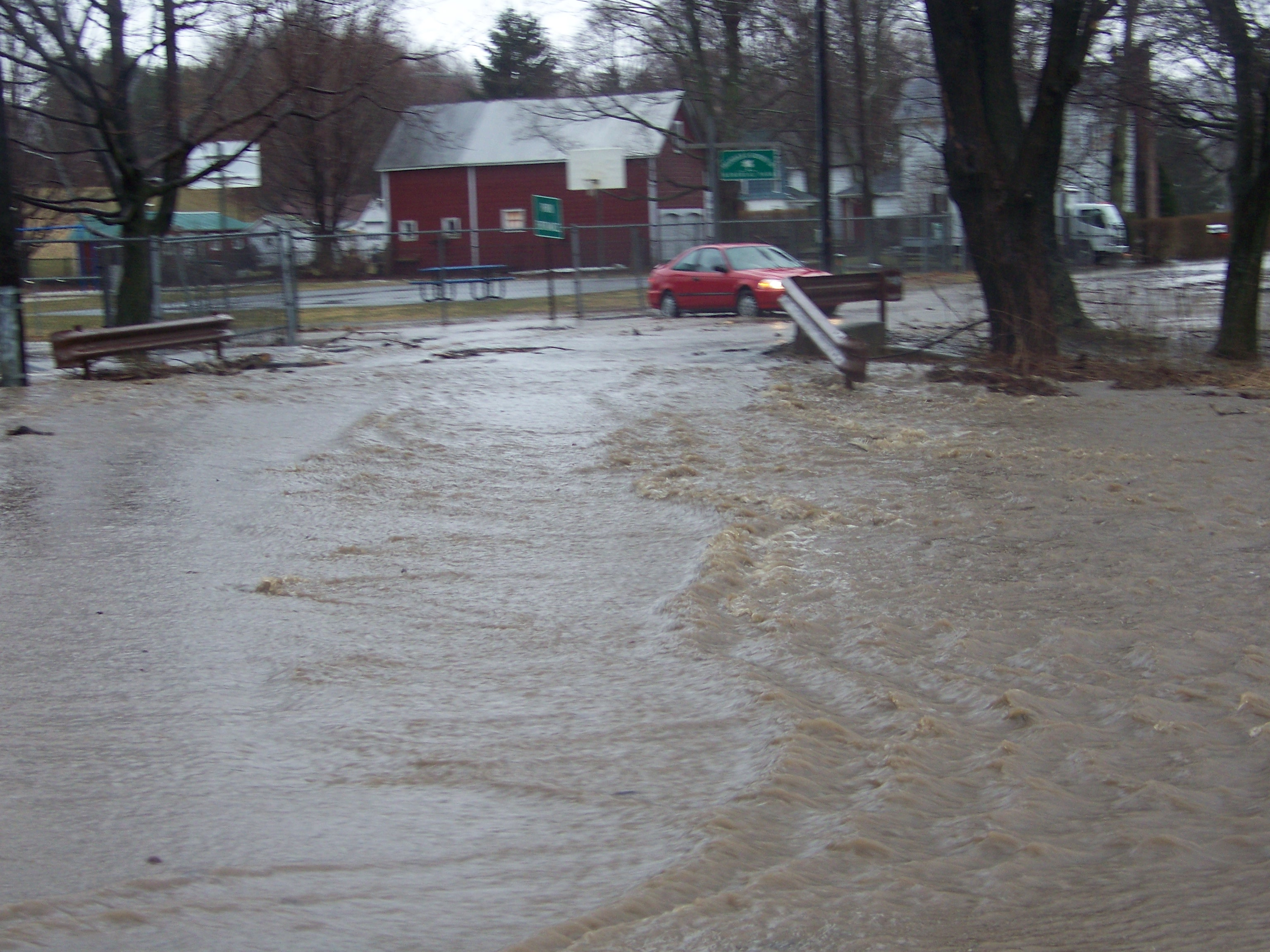
Flooding in eastern New York as a result of the heavy rain dropped by the storm.

== See also ==
- Global storm activity of 2008
- Tornadoes of 2008
