= 2008 Vietnam floods =

Vietnamese Floods

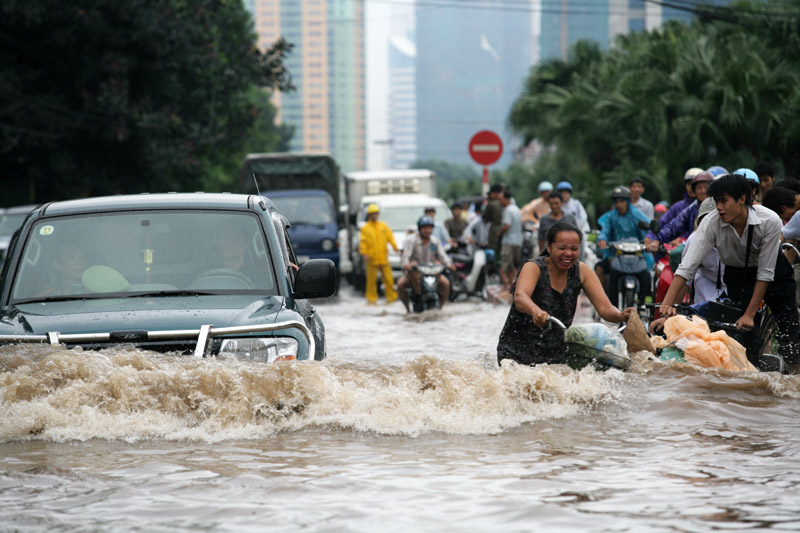
- Flooding in Hanoi

Meteorological history
- Duration: 30 October – 4 November 2008

Overall effects
- Fatalities: 100
- Areas affected: Hanoi, Hà Tĩnh, Bắc Giang, Hòa Bình, Thái Nguyên, Vĩnh Phúc, Nghệ An, Phú Thọ, Ninh Bình, Hà Nam, Lạng Sơn

Vietnam deaths by province
Hanoi	18
Hà Tĩnh Province	17
Nghệ An Province	10
Quảng Ngãi Province	4
Quảng Bình Province	4
Bắc Giang Province	3
Hòa Bình Province	2
Thái Nguyên Province	2
Vĩnh Phúc Province	2
Ninh Bình Province	1
Phú Thọ Province	1
Phú Yên Province	1
Quảng Nam Province	1
Total	66

The 2008 Vietnam floods affected north and central Vietnam, as well as southern parts of the People's Republic of China after three days of heavy rain. The rainfall, which began October 30, was the heaviest in 24 years, a state meteorological official told the Vietnam News Agency, and were the worst floods in Hanoi since 1984. At least 66 in Vietnam and 34 in China have been killed because of the flooding. Overall, 15,000 families evacuated their homes, and almost 100 schools, 100,000 houses, 241,000 hectares of crops, and 25,400 hectares of fish farms were submerged or damaged in the floodwaters.

== Vietnam ==
The floods killed a total of 55 people in Vietnam. In Hanoi, 18, including 3 children, were found dead after 13 more bodies were recovered. Up to one meter of water flooded the city's streets, and transportation was halted. Food prices, especially those of meat and vegetables, reached exorbitant highs in the city, as the rains ruined many crops. Schools were closed on November 3, and damage in Hanoi exceeded 3 trillion Vietnamese đồng ($US 177 million).

Elsewhere in Vietnam, 10 people, including 4 children were killed in Nghệ An Province from the floods. 17 were killed in Hà Tĩnh Province, 4 each in Quảng Ngãi Province and Quảng Bình Province, 3 in Bắc Giang Province, 2 each in Hòa Bình Province, Thái Nguyên Province, and Vĩnh Phúc Province, and 1 each in Ninh Bình Province, Phú Thọ Province, Quảng Nam Province, and Phú Yên Province. In addition water levels on the Cả River, Hoàng Long River, and the upper Ma River were very high. The Vietnamese Army and Vietnamese Red Cross using boats and amphibious Military vehicles to rescue survivors. Military helicopters delivered food and water supplies to residents of flooded villages cut off by the floods. Most roads leading to these areas had been washed away. 1,000 Vietnamese soldiers led rescue work, searching for bodies.

== China ==
China deaths by province
Yunnan	26
Guangxi	8
Total	34

The heavy rains affected southern parts of the People's Republic of China as well, causing mudslides and floods, and killing a total of 34 there. Yunnan Province was hit the hardest, where 26 were killed and 45 remain missing. 8 were killed in Pingguo, Guangxi. Overall, 410,000 were affected in China, and 3,200 homes there were damaged or destroyed.

== See also ==
- 2016 Vietnam floods
