= 2008 Afghanistan blizzard =

Third-deadliest blizzard in history

The 2008 Afghanistan blizzard was a fierce blizzard that struck Afghanistan on the morning of 10 January 2008. Temperatures fell to a low of −30 °C (−22 °F), with up to 180 centimetres (71 in) of snow in the more mountainous regions, killing at least 926 people. It was the third deadliest blizzard in history.

Aid organizations and foreign troops distributed several tons of clothing, blankets, food and fuel in provinces throughout the country and in remote, mountainous villages. The hospitals performed frostbite amputations on at least 100 people across the country, as many walked barefoot in the freezing cold mud and snow. The weather also claimed more than 100,0000 sheep and goats, and nearly 315,000 cattle died.
