= 2008 Pacific hurricane season =

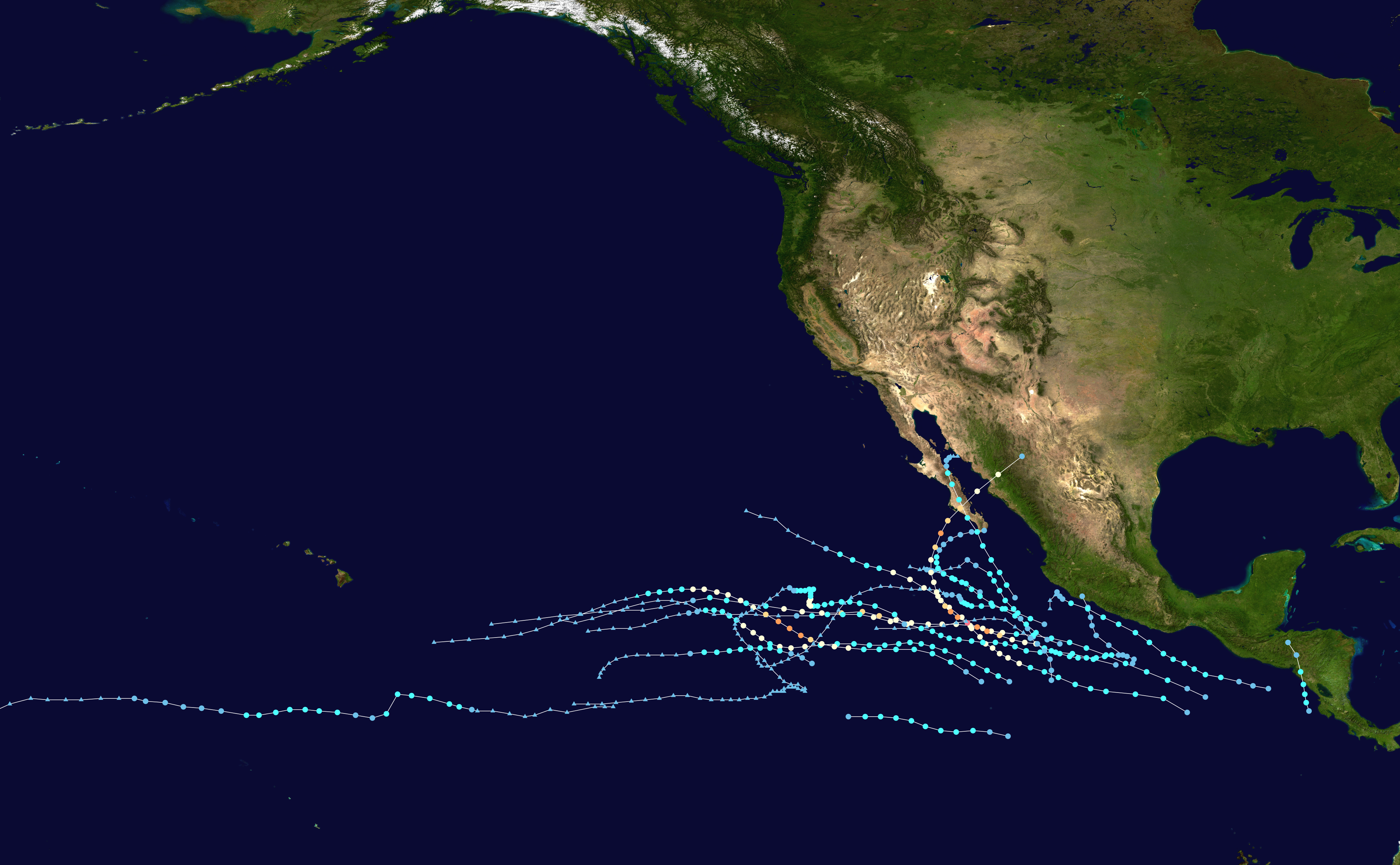
- Season summary map

Seasonal boundaries
- First system formed: May 29, 2008
- Last system dissipated: November 5, 2008

Strongest storm
- Name: Norbert
  - Maximum winds: 130 mph (215 km/h) (1-minute sustained)
  - Lowest pressure: 945 mbar (hPa; 27.91 inHg)

Seasonal statistics
- Total depressions: 19
- Total storms: 17
- Hurricanes: 7
- Major hurricanes (Cat. 3+): 2
- ACE: 83.7
- Total fatalities: 46 total
- Total damage: $152.2 million (2008 USD)

Related articles
- Timeline of the 2008 Pacific hurricane season; 2008 Atlantic hurricane season; 2008 Pacific typhoon season; 2008 North Indian Ocean cyclone season

The 2008 Pacific hurricane season was a near-average Pacific hurricane season which featured seventeen named storms, though most were rather weak and short-lived. Only seven storms became hurricanes, of which two intensified into major hurricanes. This season was also the first since 1996 to have no cyclones cross into the central Pacific (between 140°W to the International Date Line). The season officially began on May 15 in the eastern Pacific (east of 140°W) and on June 1 in the central Pacific. It ended in both regions on November 30. These dates, adopted by convention, historically describe the period in each year when most tropical cyclone formation occurs in these regions of the Pacific. This season, the first system, Tropical Storm Alma, formed on May 29, and the last, Tropical Storm Polo, dissipated on November 5.

During the season, 4 eastern Pacific systems (Julio, Karina, Lowell, and Marie) developed, at least in part, from tropical waves that had already produced named storms in the Atlantic basin. Several storms affected land this year. Alma made landfall along the Pacific coast of Nicaragua, becoming the first known storm to do so. It killed 9 and caused over US$35 million in damage (value in 2008). Hurricane Norbert became the strongest hurricane to hit the western side of the Baja Peninsula on record, killing 25 and causing widespread damage over Baja California Sur, Sonora, and Sinaloa in Mexico. Tropical Depression Five-E made landfall along the south-western Mexican coastline in July 2008, producing heavy rainfall in parts of southwestern Mexico, which these rains triggered flooding that killed two people and left roughly $2.2 million in damages. Julio produced lightning and locally heavy rainfall, which left more than a dozen communities isolated due to flooding. The flooding damaged several houses and killed two people. Lowell left $15.5 million in damage as it made landfall in Baja California Peninsula as a tropical depression, and affected parts of West Coast and the Gulf Coast. Odile dumped squally rainfall on Central America as a tropical wave, while it brought heavy rainfall across southern Mexico.

== Seasonal forecasts ==
Predictions of tropical activity in the 2008 season
Source	Date	Named storms	Hurricanes	Major hurricanes	Ref
Average (1971–2005)		14.5	8.4	4.3
Record high activity		27	16	11
Record low activity		8	3	0
SMN	May 16, 2008	15	7	2
CPC	May 22, 2008	11–16	5–8	1–3
	Actual activity	17	7	2

On May 16, 2008, the Servicio Meteorológico Nacional posted their outlook for the 2008 Pacific hurricane season, forecasting 15 named storms, 7 hurricanes, and 2 major hurricanes. Three days later, the National Oceanic and Atmospheric Administration's Central Pacific Hurricane Center released their forecast for the central Pacific, predicting three or four tropical cyclones to form or cross into the basin; an average season sees four or five tropical cyclones, of which two further intensify into hurricanes. On May 22, meanwhile, the Climate Prediction Center released their outlook, forecasting a 70 percent probability of a below-average year, a 25 percent chance of a near-average year, and only a 5 percent chance of an above-average year. The organization predicted 11–16 named storms, 5–8 hurricanes, 1–3 major hurricanes, and an accumulated cyclone energy (ACE) index 40–100 percent of the long-term median. All three groups cited the effects of the ongoing La Niña, as well as the continuation of a multi-decadal decline in Pacific hurricane activity, as their reasoning behind the below-average forecasts.

== Seasonal summary ==
The accumulated cyclone energy (ACE) index for the 2008 Pacific hurricane season as calculated by Colorado State University using data from the National Hurricane Center was 83.8 units. (Note: The total represents the sum of the squares of the maximum sustained wind speed (knots) for every (sub)tropical storm's intensity of over 33 knots (38 mph; 61 km/h), divided by 10,000 while they are above that threshold; therefore, tropical depressions are not included.) Broadly speaking, ACE is a measure of the power of a tropical or subtropical storm multiplied by the length of time it existed. It is only calculated for full advisories on specific tropical and subtropical systems reaching or exceeding wind speeds of 39 mph (63 km/h).

The activity of the season was relatively quiet overall, with 16 named storms, 7 hurricanes, 2 major hurricanes; 1 tropical storm formed in the Central Pacific. The main contributing factor to a slower season was the 2007–08 La Niña event in the equatorial Pacific; although cold ocean temperature anomalies dissipated during the early summer of 2008, a La Niña-like atmospheric circulation persisted. This led to anomalously strong easterly wind shear across the East Pacific, hindering the intensification of most tropical cyclones. In addition, water temperatures across the basin were cooler than in years past, though still near the long-term average.

The first storm of the year, Alma, developed on May 29 farther east than any other Eastern Pacific cyclone on record, excluding Atlantic systems that crossed over into the basin. Later that day, it made landfall on the Pacific coast of Central America, the first cyclone to do so since the 1949 Texas hurricane. June and July saw near average tropical cyclone activity, while August was a below-average month overall. September 2008 was the quietest since reliable records began in 1971, with a monthly ACE index only 9 percent of average. In terms of ACE, seasonal activity ended about 75 percent of the long-term median.

== Systems ==
=== Tropical Storm Alma ===
- Tropical storm (SSHWS)
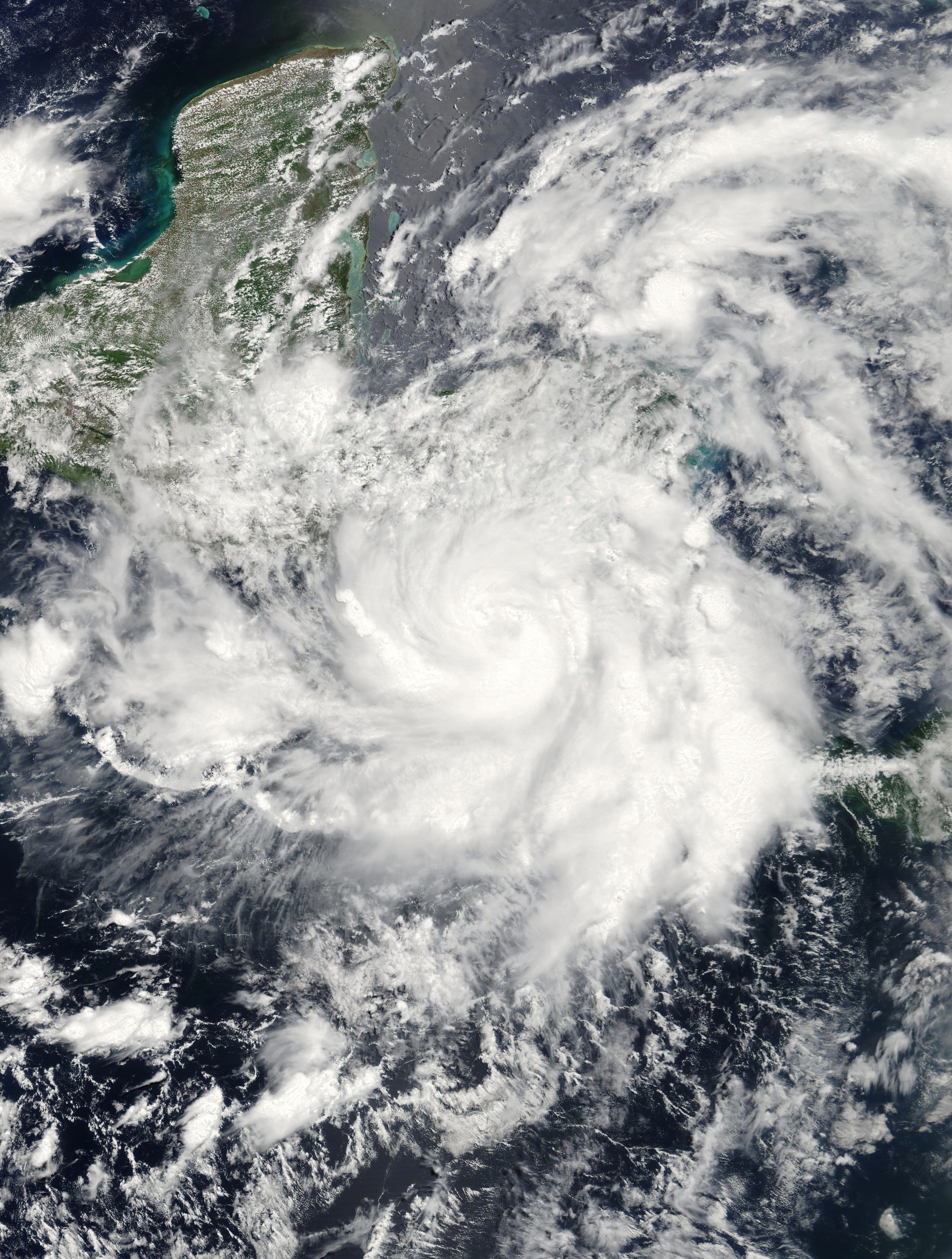
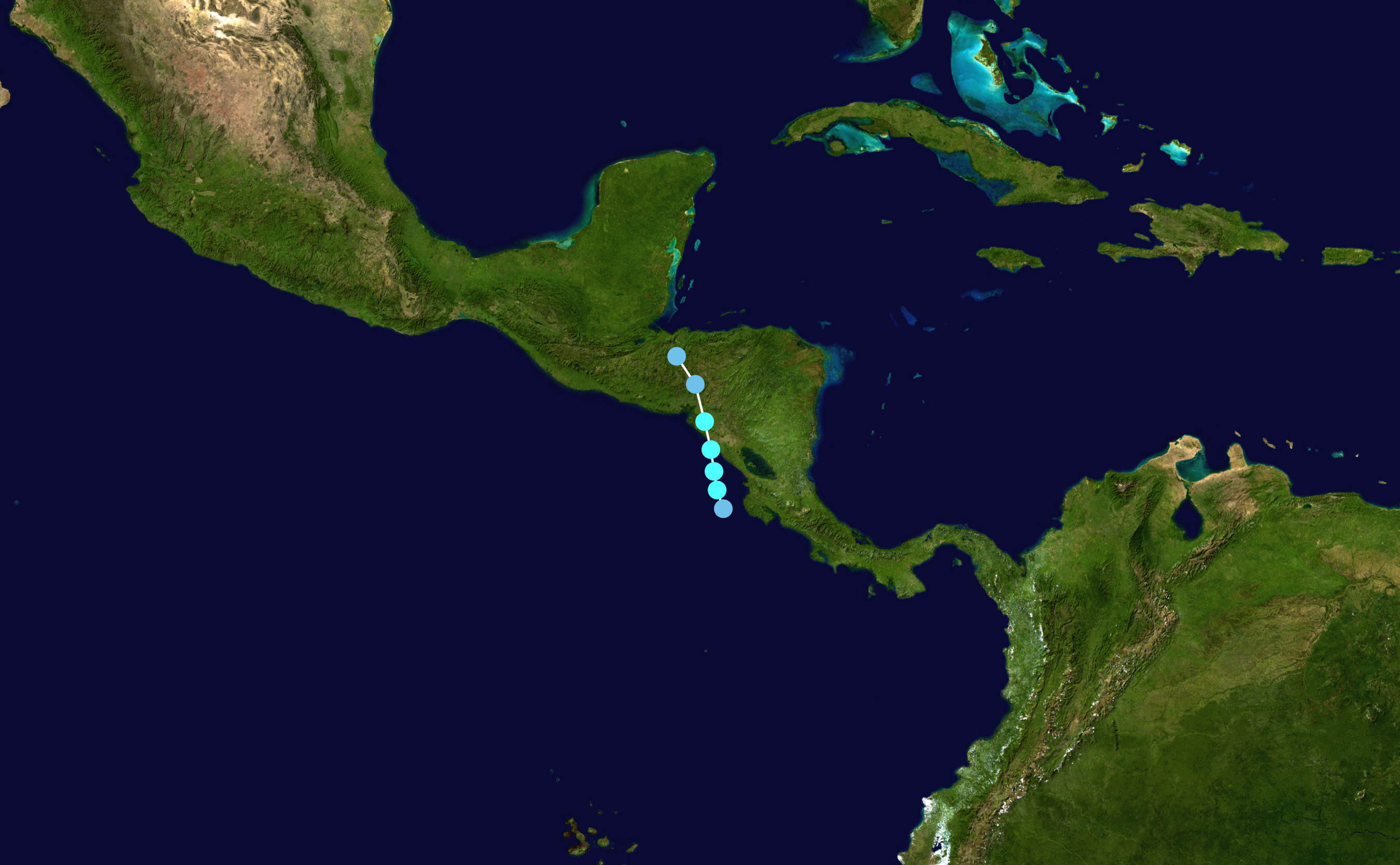
- Duration: May 29 – May 30
- Peak intensity: 65 mph (100 km/h) (1-min); 994 mbar (hPa)

A nearly stationary trough of low pressure formed over the extreme eastern Pacific in late May, and the system organized into a tropical depression around 00:00 UTC on May 29, becoming the easternmost-forming tropical cyclone on record in the basin. The newly formed system intensified into a tropical storm six hours later, earning the name Alma, and attained peak winds of 65 mph (105 km/h) around 18:00 UTC as an eye-like feature became apparent on satellite. Moving northward, Alma made landfall near León, Nicaragua, at that strength before rapidly weakening inland. Its low-level circulation dissipated over the mountains of western Honduras around 18:00 UTC on May 30, but remnant convective activity aided in the formation of Tropical Storm Arthur in the western Caribbean a day later.

Alma produced devastating rainfall across Central America, with peak accumulations of 14.82 in (376 mm) in Quepos, Costa Rica. The nearby cities of Guanacaste and Puntarenas were most heavily affected with over 1,000 homes damaged, of which over 150 were destroyed. Throughout all of Costa Rica, more than 100 roads and bridges were damaged, leaving several communities isolated for several days. In Nicaragua, the departments of León and Chinandega saw approximately 200 homes damaged; across Honduras, an additional 175 homes were adversely impacted. Six people died in Honduras: a young girl who was swept away by a fast-moving river and five people who perished following the crash of TACA Flight 390. Two more deaths occurred in Nicaragua due to electrocutions from downed power lines, and one death occurred offshore when a fishing vessel sank. Nine people on boats went missing in the wake of the cyclone.

=== Hurricane Boris ===
- Category 1 hurricane (SSHWS)
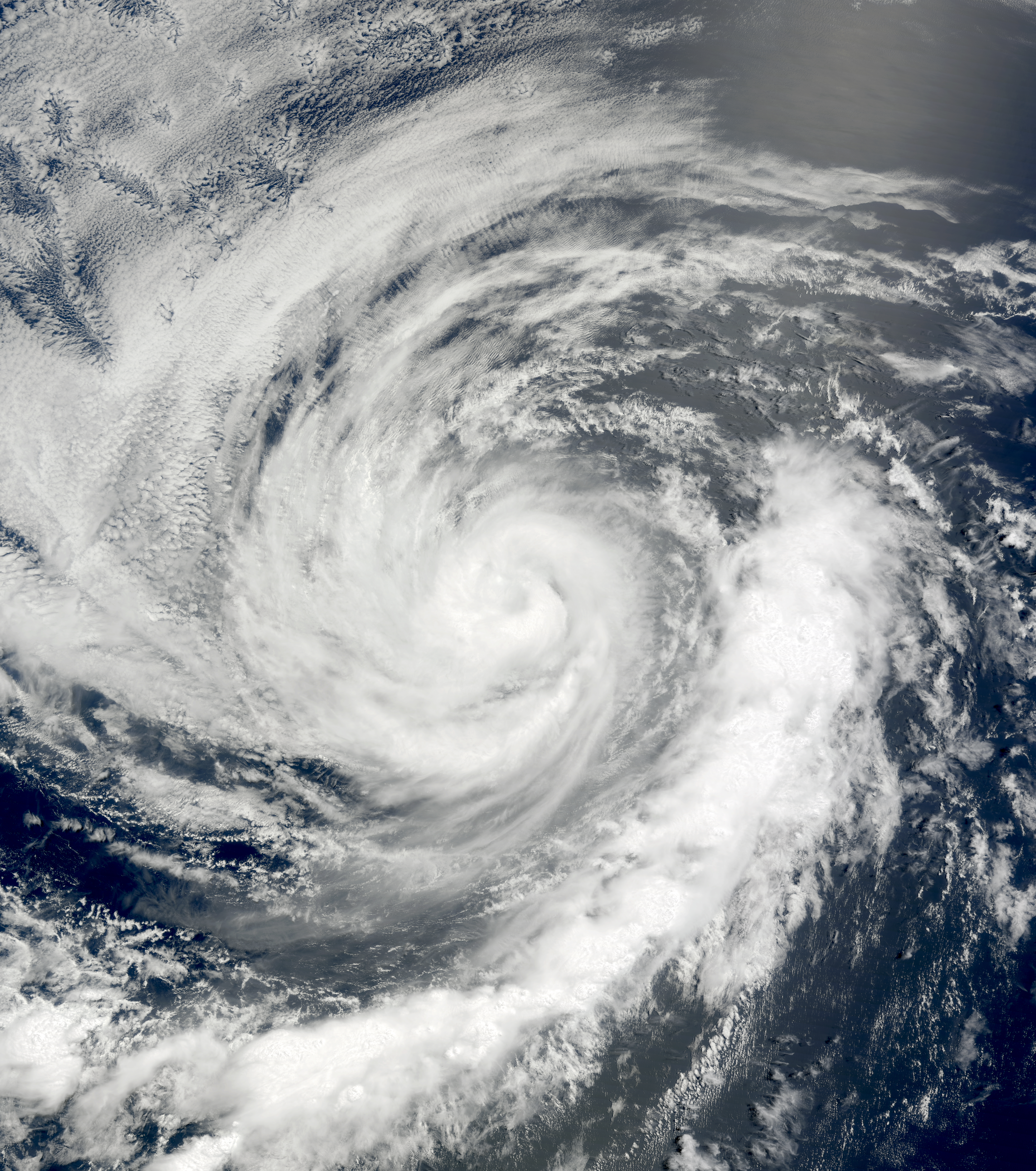
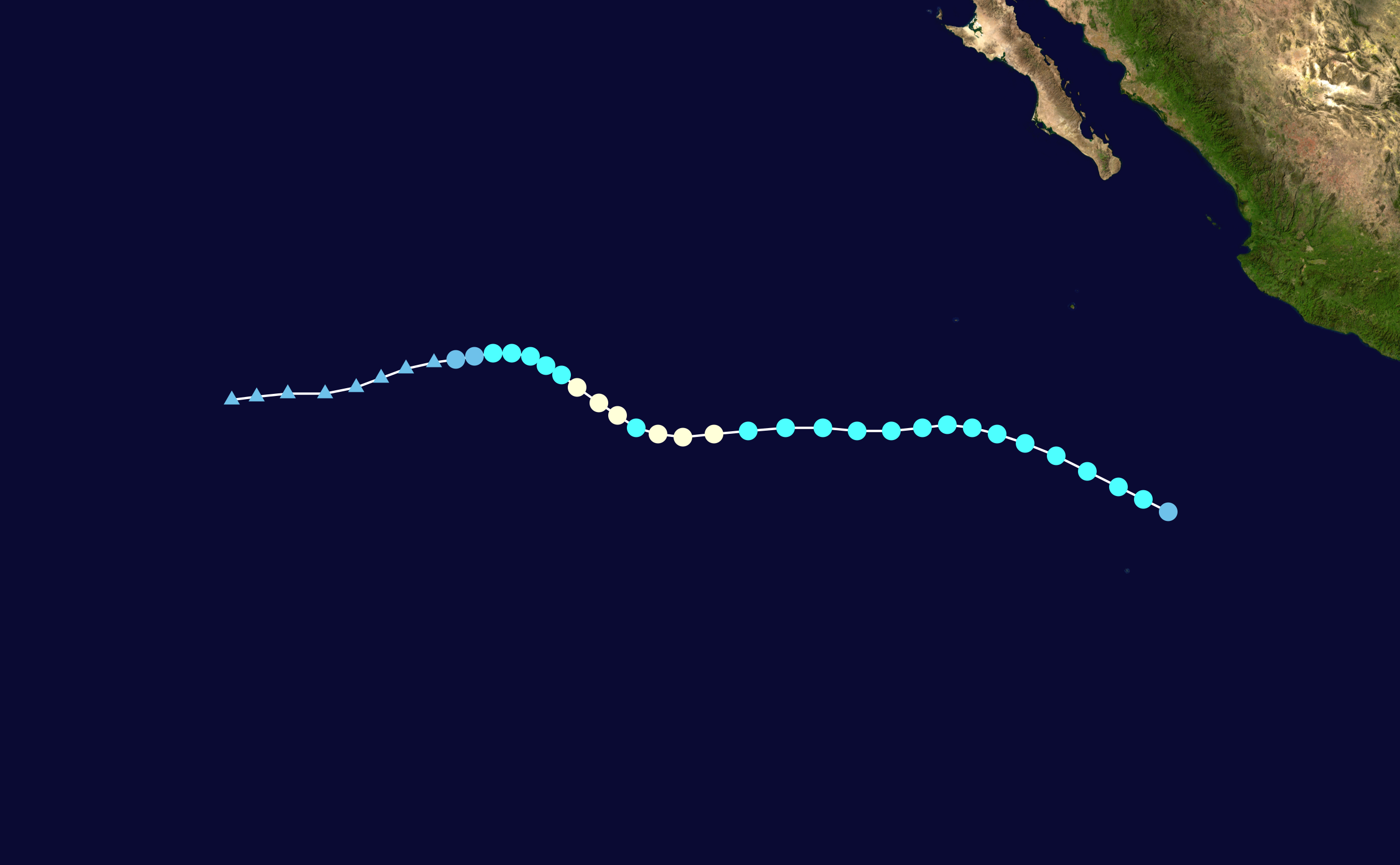
- Duration: June 27 – July 4
- Peak intensity: 80 mph (130 km/h) (1-min); 985 mbar (hPa)

A westward-moving tropical wave departed the western coast of Africa on June 14 and entered the eastern Pacific a week later. A broad surface low formed in association with the feature south of the Gulf of Tehuantepec on June 23, and its organization led to the development of a tropical depression around 06:00 UTC on June 27. The cyclone only slowly organized in a moderate wind shear regime, becoming Tropical Storm Boris six hours later and remaining fairly steady state for a few days thereafter. Shear lessened on June 29, allowing Boris to attain hurricane intensity two days later as an eye developed. This feature was temporarily eroded late on July 1, but reappeared by 06:00 UTC on July 2 when the cyclone attained peak winds of 80 mph (130 km/h). Cold waters and a more stable environment then prompted rapid weakening, and Boris ultimately degenerated to a remnant low by 12:00 UTC on July 4. The post-tropical cyclone continued westward until dissipating early on July 6.

=== Tropical Storm Cristina ===
- Tropical storm (SSHWS)
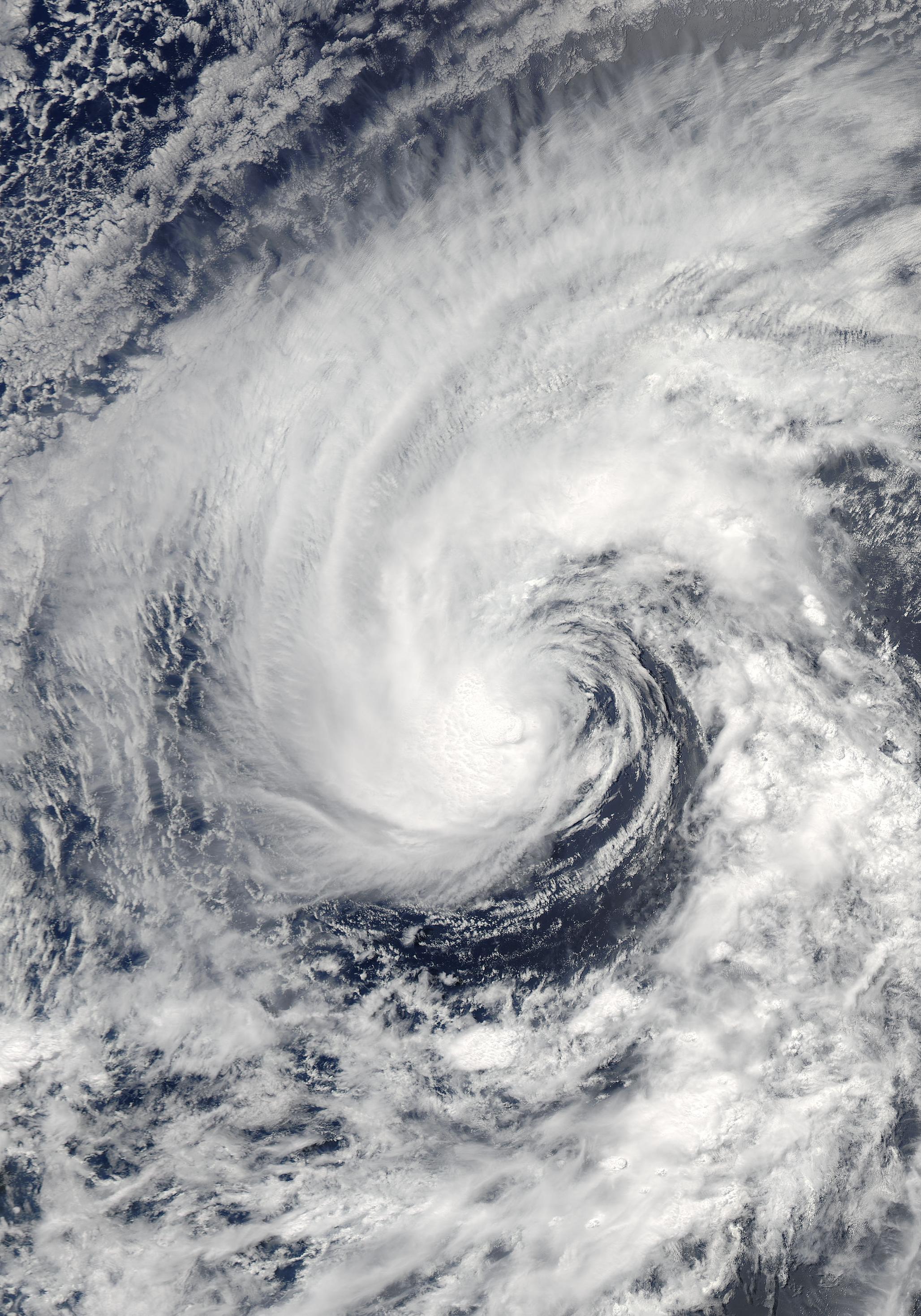
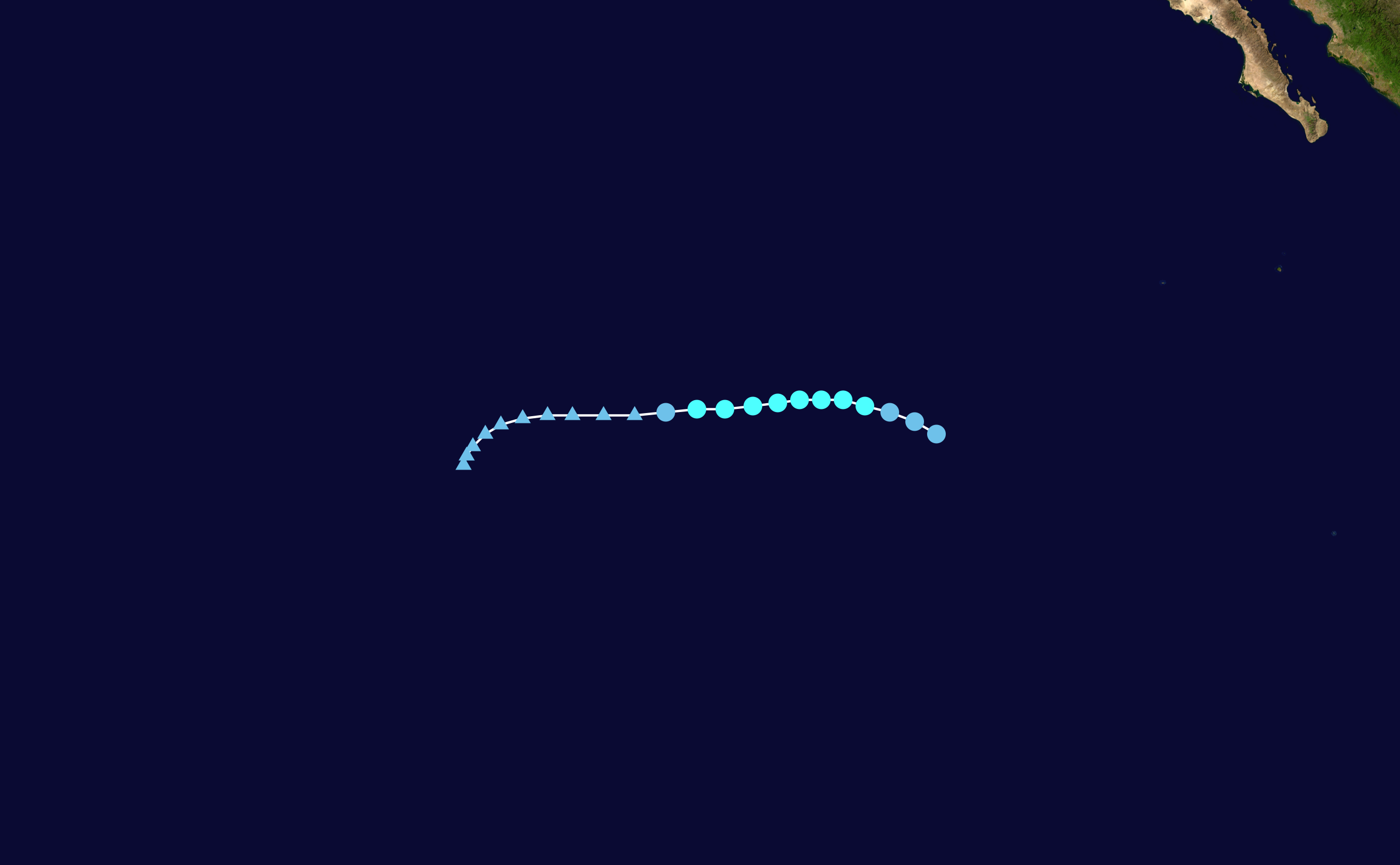
- Duration: June 27 – June 30
- Peak intensity: 50 mph (85 km/h) (1-min); 999 mbar (hPa)

The season's third tropical depression developed around 18:00 UTC on June 27 from a tropical wave that crossed Central America four days prior. In an environment of low shear but abundant dry air and marginal ocean temperatures, the depression intensified into Tropical Storm Cristina around 12:00 UTC on June 28 before attaining peak winds of 50 mph (80 km/h) six hours later. The cyclone moved west-northwest and then west as high pressure expanded to its north. Abundant dry air and stronger upper-level winds capped the storm's organization to intermittent, amorphous bursts of convection that eventually dissipated, and Cristina degenerated to a remnant low around 18:00 UTC on June 30. The low turned southward before dissipating on July 3.

=== Tropical Storm Douglas ===
- Tropical storm (SSHWS)
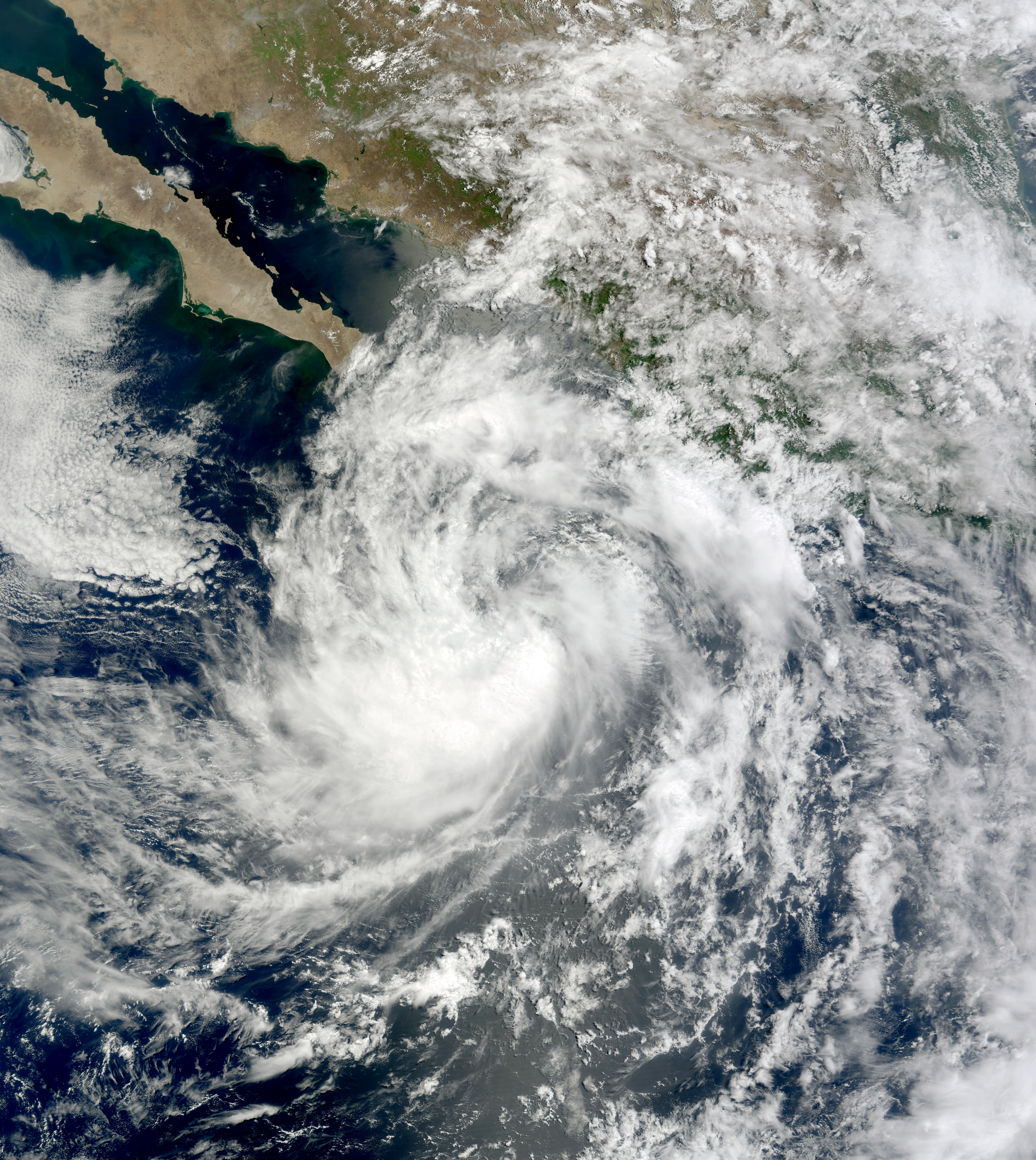
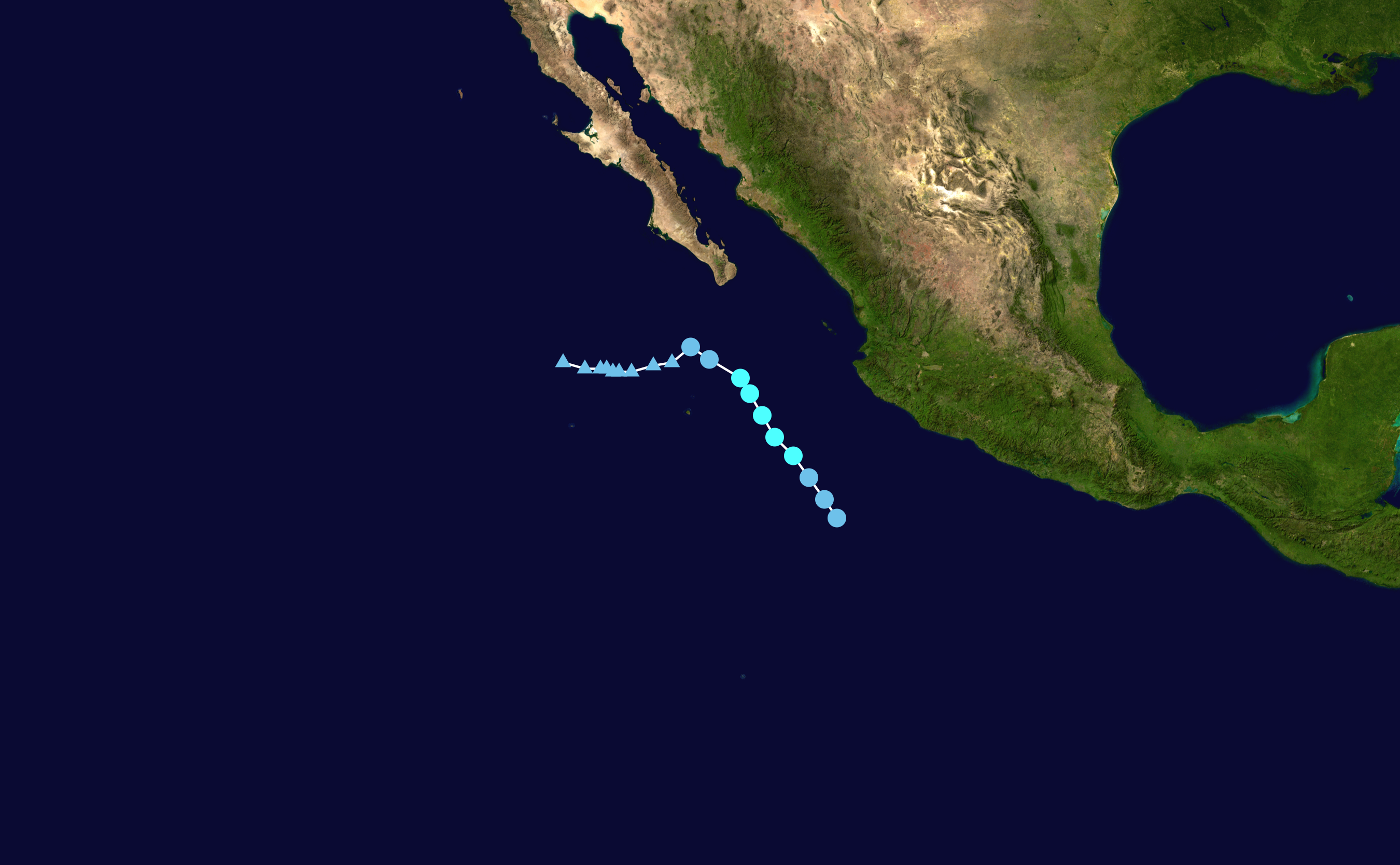
- Duration: July 1 – July 4
- Peak intensity: 40 mph (65 km/h) (1-min); 1003 mbar (hPa)

An organized tropical wave departed the western coast of Africa on June 19 and reached the waters south of the Gulf of Tehuantepec late the next week. The system steadily congealed into a tropical depression by 18:00 UTC on July 1. Paralleling the coastline of southwestern Mexico, the depression intensified into Tropical Storm Douglas and attained peak winds of 40 mph (65 km/h) around 12:00 UTC the next morning, despite the effects of strong northeasterly wind shear. As upper-level winds increased further and Douglas tracked northwest into cooler waters, it began a weakening trend that ended in its degeneration to a remnant low around 06:00 UTC on July 4. The low turned west within low-level flow and dissipated two days later.

Due to the proximity to land, outer rain bands associated with Douglas produced tropical storm force winds in Manzanillo, Mexico. Minor flood damage was reported along the coastline in Colima, Jalisco, and Nayarit. Moisture associated with Douglas produced light rain over parts of Baja California Sur, with heavier amounts in Todos los Santos.

=== Tropical Depression Five-E ===
- Tropical depression (SSHWS)
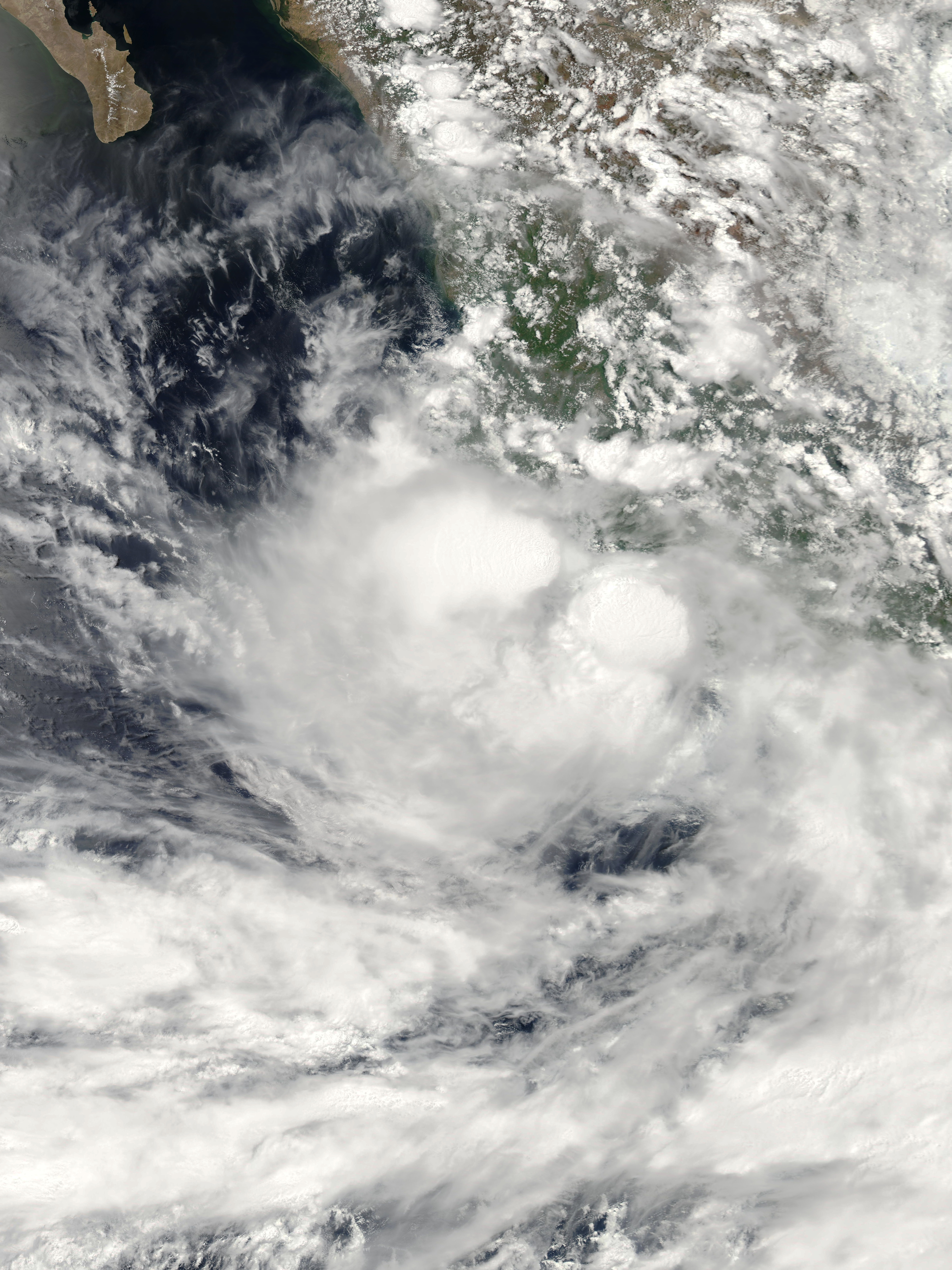
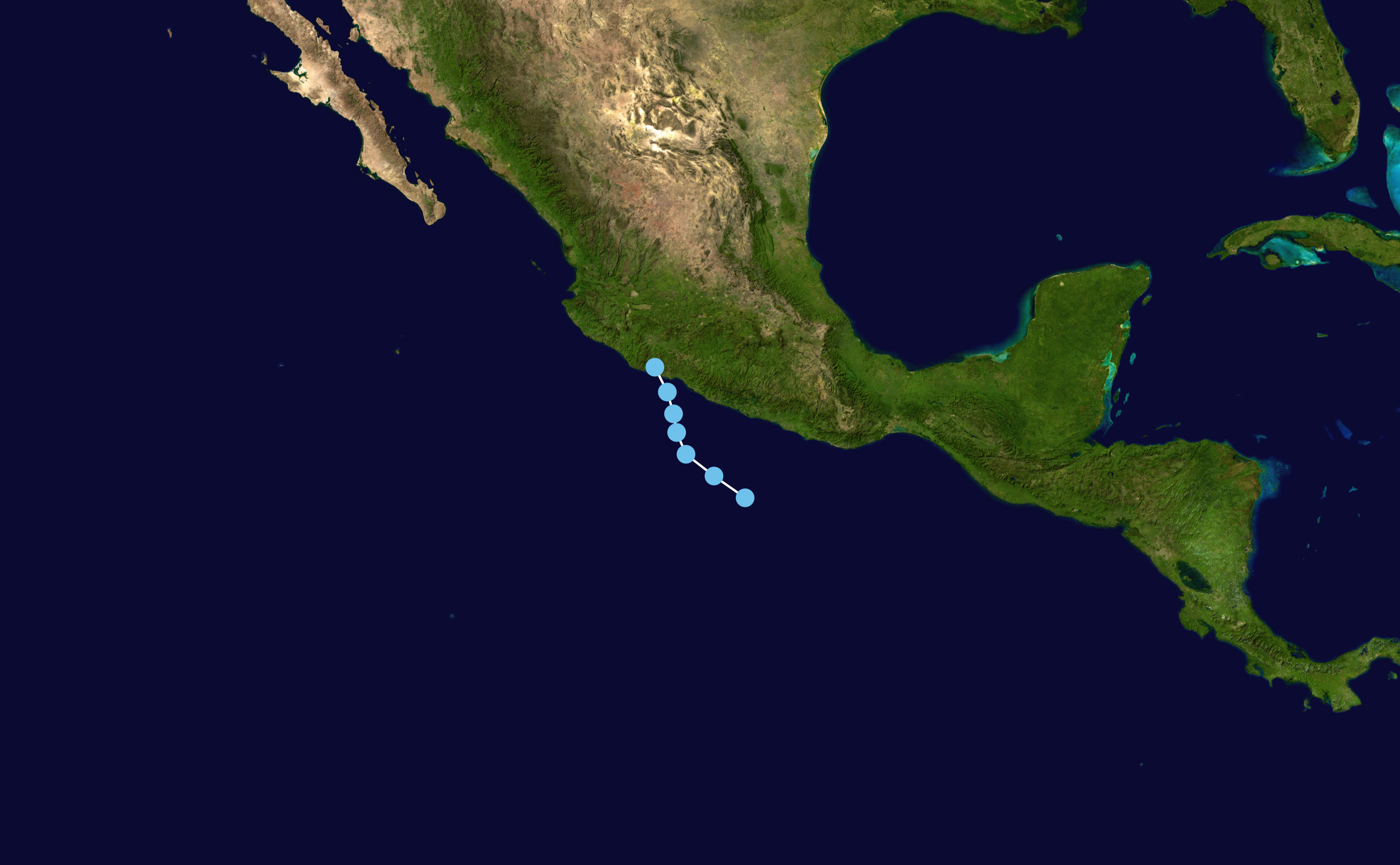
- Duration: July 5 – July 7
- Peak intensity: 35 mph (55 km/h) (1-min); 1005 mbar (hPa)

On July 2, a tropical wave crossed Central America into the eastern Pacific, having exited Africa on June 23. Despite the presence of wind shear, an area of convection developed into Tropical Depression Five-E on July 5 off the southwest coast of Mexico. The depression initially moved to the northwest, parallel to the coastline of Mexico, although a weakening ridge turned the cyclone northward. The depression remained disorganized, and moved ashore Mexico near Lázaro Cárdenas, Michoacán, early on July 7. It dissipated over the mountainous terrain a few hours later.

The government of Mexico issued tropical storm warnings from Acapulco to Zihuatanejo. The tropical depression produced 5.11 inches (130 mm) of rain in Manzanillo, with other locations also experiencing isolated rainfall. Cerro de Ortega, Colima reported 12.99 inches (330 mm) of rain in a 24-hour period. The community of Ometepec reported 7.88 inches (200 mm). One person was swept away by flood waters, reaching 1 m (3.3 ft) in depth. Heavy rains from the depression resulted in a traffic accident that killed one person and injured two others. Approximately 200 homes were damaged, affecting 2,000 people. Several banana plantations were damaged by the storm. In all, damages from the storm amounted to MXN 30 million ($2.2 million).

=== Hurricane Elida ===
- Category 2 hurricane (SSHWS)
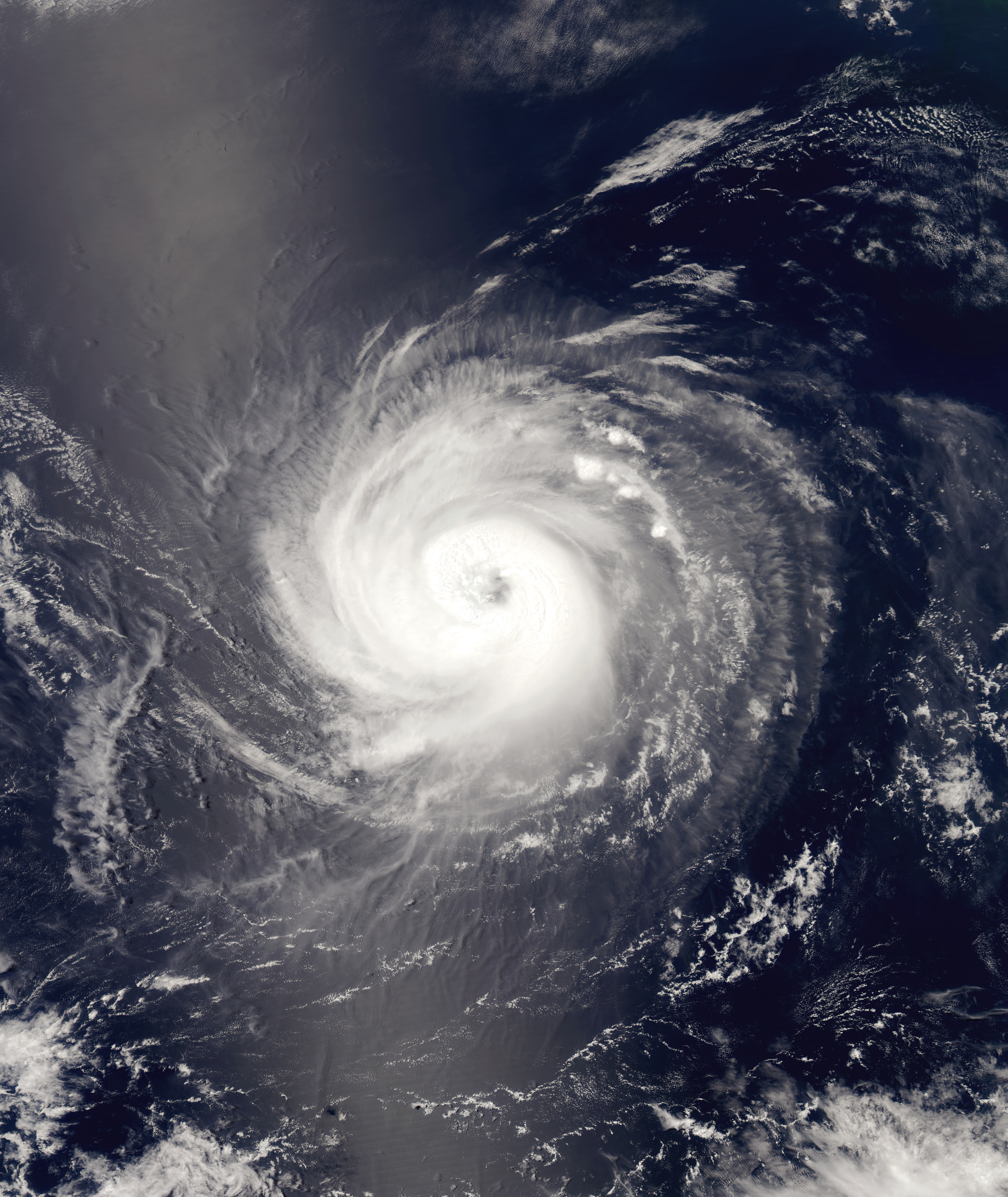
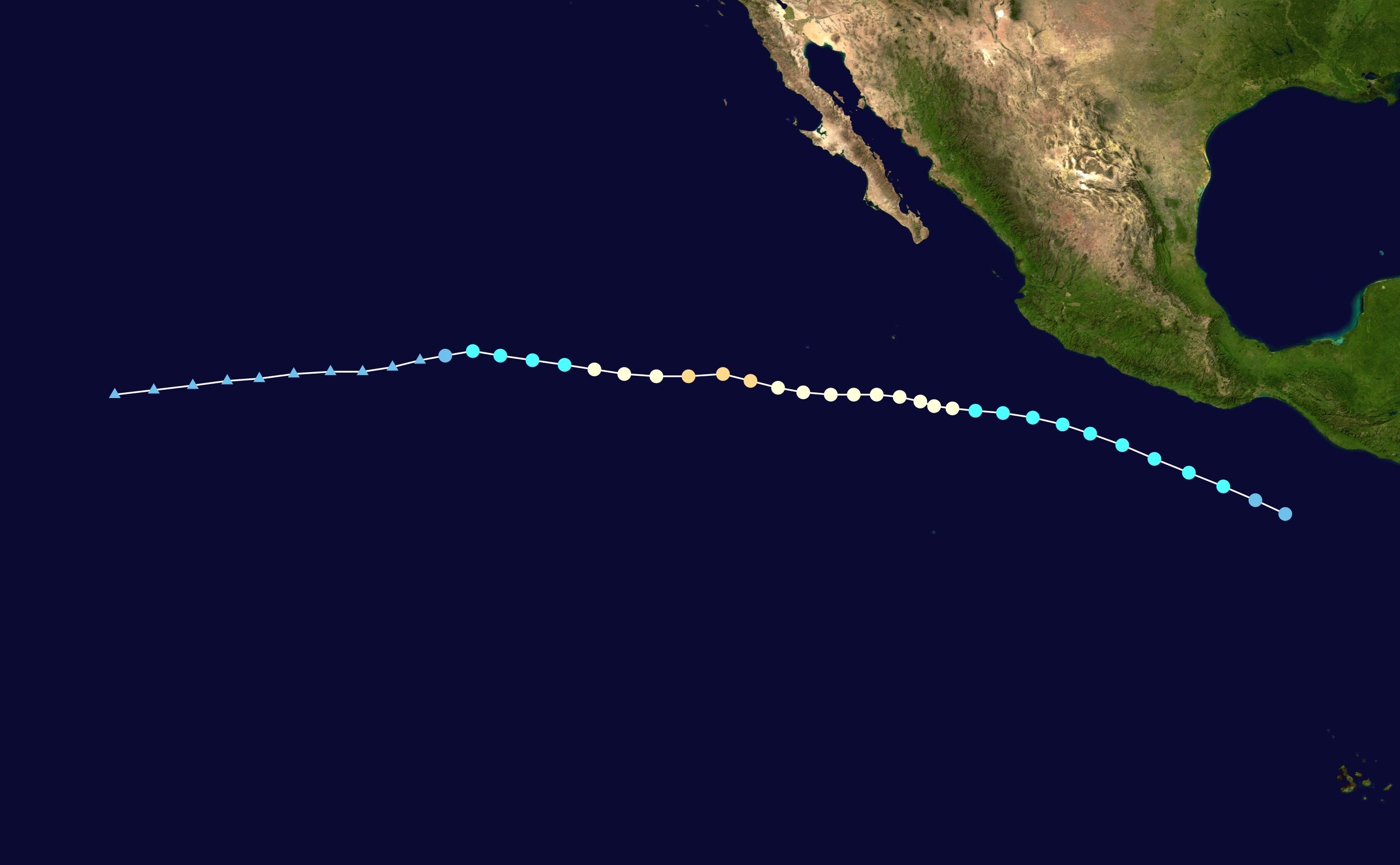
- Duration: July 11 – July 19
- Peak intensity: 105 mph (165 km/h) (1-min); 970 mbar (hPa)

A tropical wave, indistinguishable in the Atlantic basin, crossed the coastline of Central America on July 8 and organized into a tropical depression three days later around 18:00 UTC. With a mid-level ridge extending from the Gulf of Mexico into western Mexico, the newly formed cyclone moved west-northwest within an increasingly favorable environment, intensifying into Tropical Storm Elida by 06:00 UTC on July 12 and becoming the season's first hurricane around 12:00 UTC on July 14. An abrupt increase in wind shear briefly weakened the storm the next day, but by 18:00 UTC on July 16, the formation of an eye within Elida's round central dense overcast showcased its peak as a Category 2 hurricane with winds of 105 mph (170 km/h). The system then tracked into cooler waters and stronger upper-level winds, causing it to fall below hurricane intensity by 06:00 UTC on July 18 and degenerate to a remnant low early the next morning, although it maintained a well-defined circulation. The low ultimately dissipated well east-southeast of Hawaii by 00:00 UTC on July 22.

Due to the proximity of Elida to Mexico, the Government of Mexico warned residents about the possibility of heavy rains from the outer edges of the storm. Thunderstorms related to Elida developed over Oaxaca, Guerrero, Michoacán, Colima and Jalisco. In Nayarit, Elida produced storms that dropped torrential rainfall and hail that injured at least one person. The rainfall resulted in the formation of a lake roughly 45 cm (18 in) deep. Several trees feel, blocking streets for several hours. Street flooding reached a depth of 20 cm (7.9 in), inundating shops and some homes. Indirect effects, such as large swells, were felt along the Mexican coastline as the storm produced waves up to 4 m (13 ft). However, as trade winds increased during the middle of July, the remnants of Elida brought rainfall to east-facing slopes of the Island of Hawaii and Maui. Frequent rain showers produced 2 to 6 inches (51 to 152 mm) of precipitation in those regions, but no significant flooding occurred.

=== Hurricane Fausto ===
- Category 1 hurricane (SSHWS)
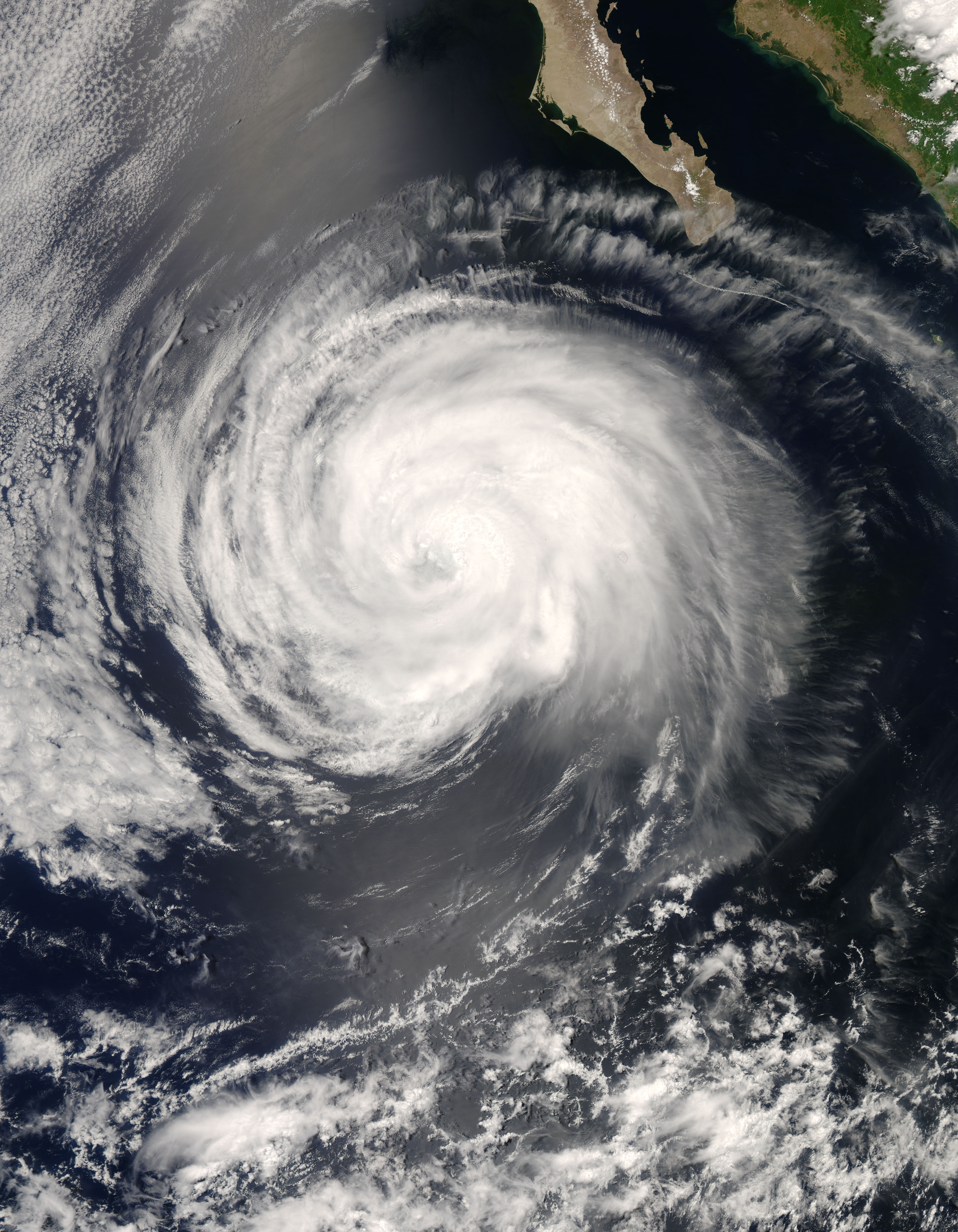
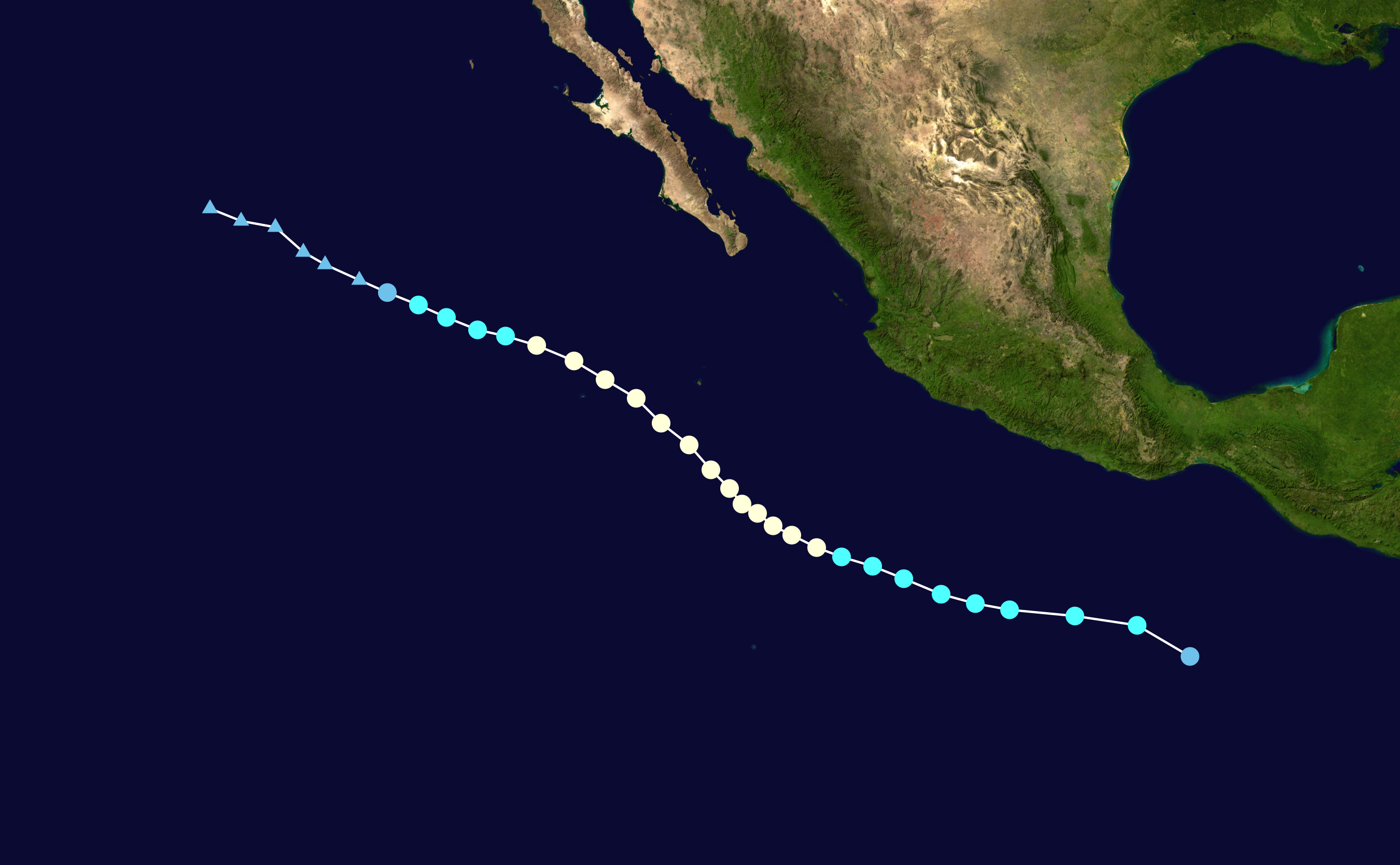
- Duration: July 16 – July 22
- Peak intensity: 90 mph (150 km/h) (1-min); 977 mbar (hPa)

A tropical wave exited western Africa on July 4, which moved westward across the Atlantic without development. It entered the eastern Pacific on July 12 and began to show signs of development the next day. On July 16, the system organized into Tropical Depression 7E, located about 550 mi (885 km) southeast of Acapulco, Mexico. Steered by a ridge to the north, the system moved generally northwestward throughout its duration. With thunderstorms located around the circulation amid moderate wind shear, the depression quickly intensified into Tropical Storm Fausto. As a large cyclone, Fausto slowly intensified, with relaxing wind shear and warm waters. Although the circulation was occasionally exposed from the thunderstorms, a banding eye feature began to develop on July 18. Fausto attained hurricane status later that day. On July 20, Fausto attained peak winds of 90 mph (145 km/h) and a minimum pressure of 977 mbar (hPa; 28.85 inHg). Around that time, the hurricane passed between the islands of Clarion and Socorro. Cooler waters caused Fausto to weaken, diminishing convective activity. On July 21, the hurricane weakened to a tropical storm, and further to a tropical depression the next day. With little or no remaining convection, the system degenerated into a remnant low-pressure area as it traveled towards the west-northwest. The remnants of Fausto dissipated on July 24, while located about 1,065 mi (1,714 km) west of Cabo San Lucas.

The outer bands of Fausto produced moderate rainfall over portions of Sinaloa, Mexico, peaking at 1.9 in (48 mm). Several hours before the center of Fausto passed between Clarion Island and Socorro Island, sustained winds on Clarion were recorded at 64 mph (103 km/h) with gusts to 94 mph (151 km/h). Nearby Socorro recorded sustained winds of 79 mph (127 km/h) with gusts to 109 mph (175 km/h). Little or no damage was recorded on the islands. The hurricane-force winds reported on Socorro was recorded as Fausto made its closest approach to the island about 115 mi (185 km) to the southwest. However, due to the distance from the center of Fausto, these winds are suspected to be overestimated. Along the coastline of Mexico, waves up to 8 ft (2.4 m) were recorded in relation to Fausto.

=== Hurricane Genevieve ===
- Category 1 hurricane (SSHWS)
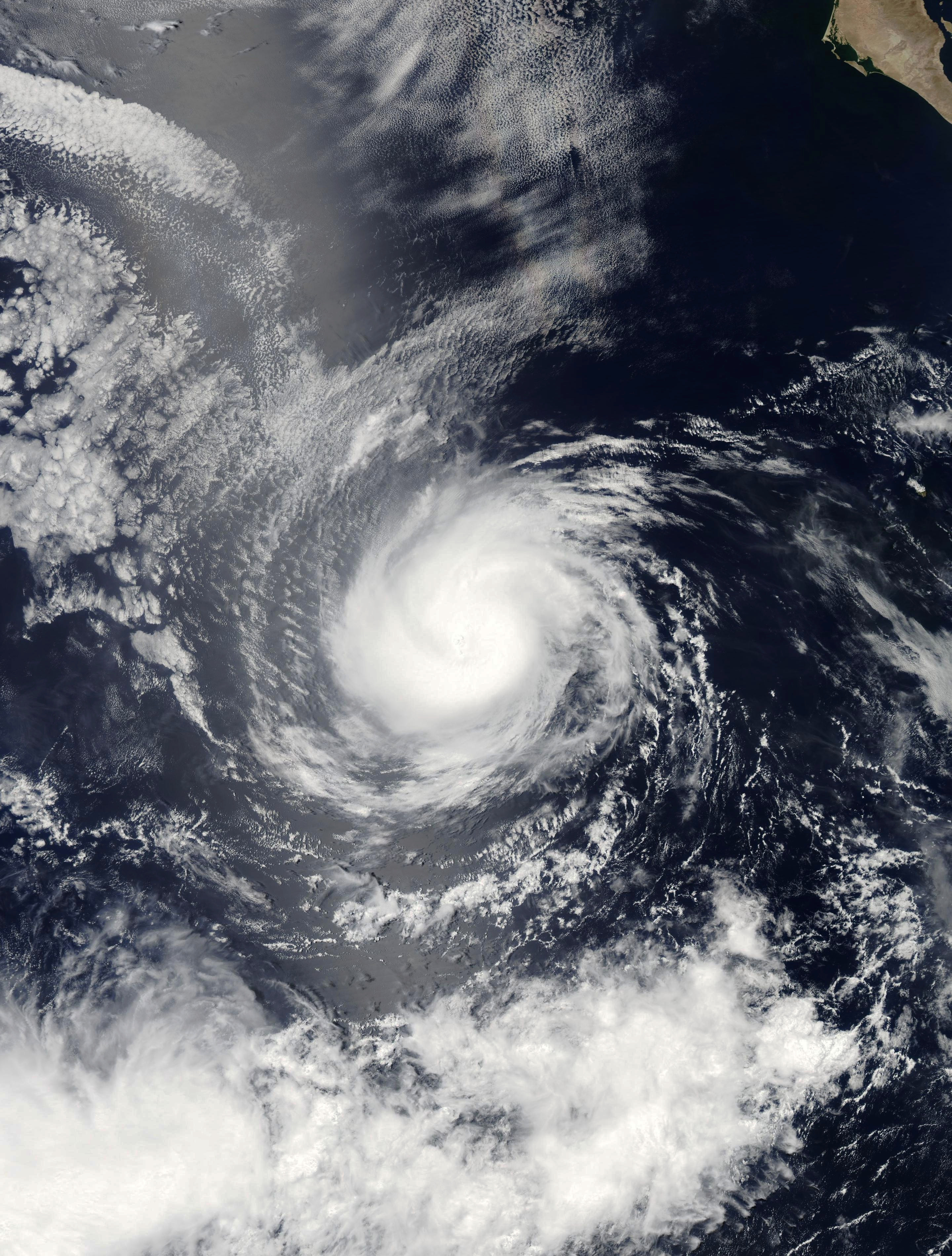
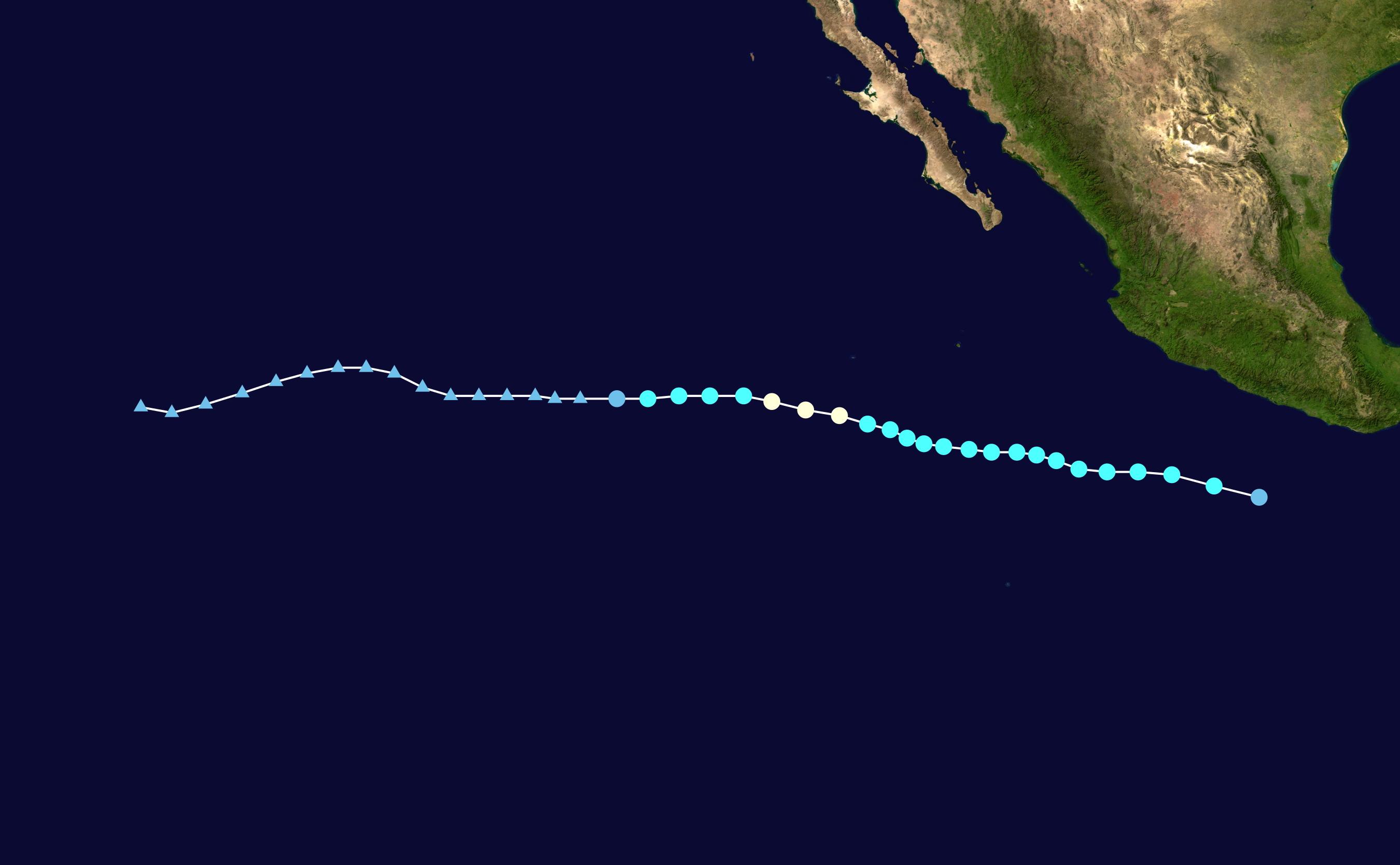
- Duration: July 21 – July 27
- Peak intensity: 75 mph (120 km/h) (1-min); 987 mbar (hPa)

A tropical wave moved off Africa on July 6, spawning an area of low pressure over the western Caribbean Sea ten days later. After crossing into the eastern Pacific, the disturbance organized into a tropical depression around 12:00 UTC on July 21 and intensified into Tropical Storm Genevieve six hours later. Moderate easterly wind shear gave way to more favorable upper-level winds following formation, but the system soon tracked over cooler ocean waters caused by Hurricane Fausto, limiting its development. By July 25, however, Genevieve moved into warmer waters and attained its peak as a Category 1 hurricane with winds of 75 mph (120 km/h); its satellite presentation at this time was characterized by hints of an eye within a small central dense overcast. Encountering strong northerly wind shear, the cyclone began a steady weakening trend shortly thereafter and ultimately degenerated to a remnant low around 12:00 UTC on July 27. The low continued west and dissipated four days later.

=== Hurricane Hernan ===
- Category 3 hurricane (SSHWS)
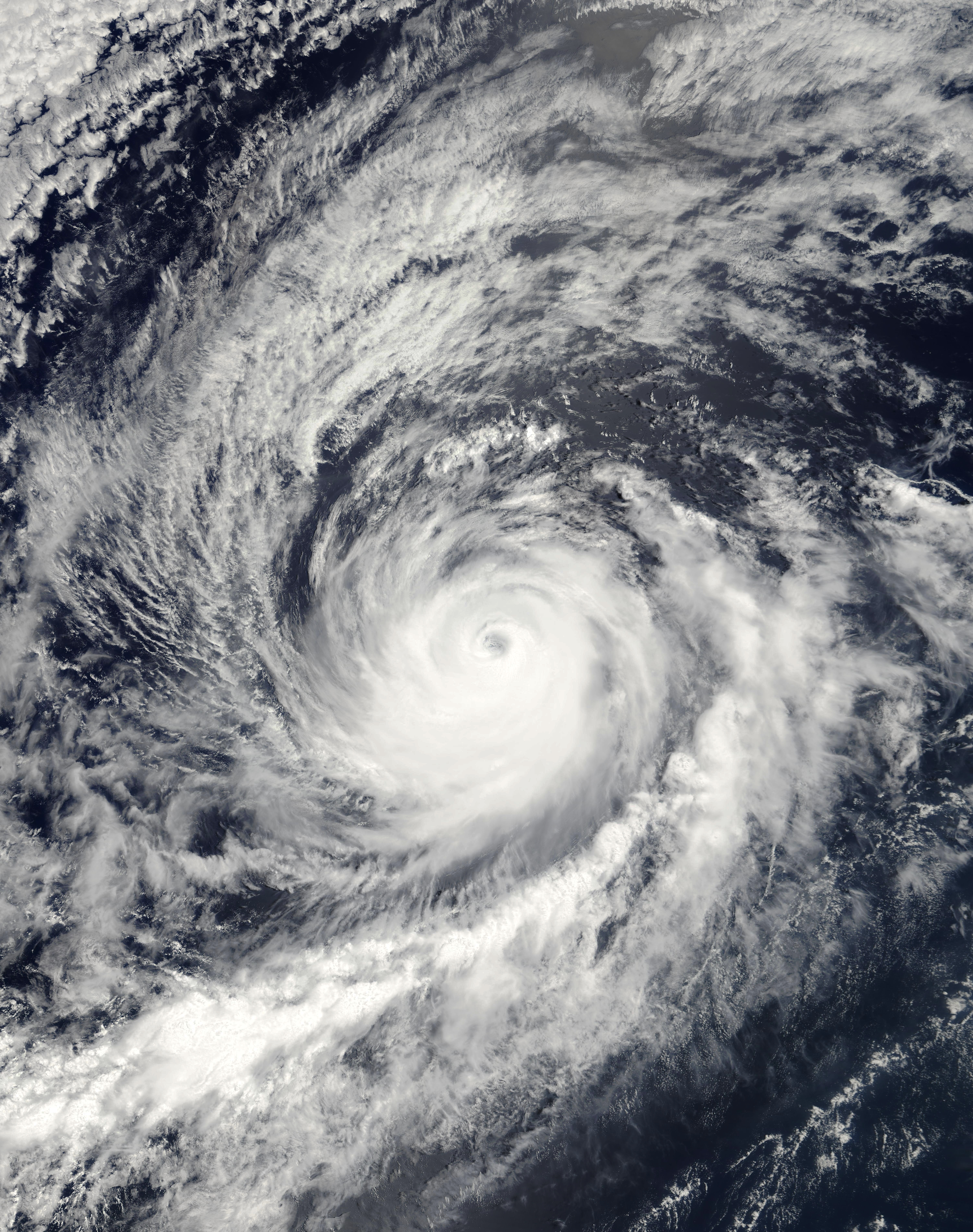
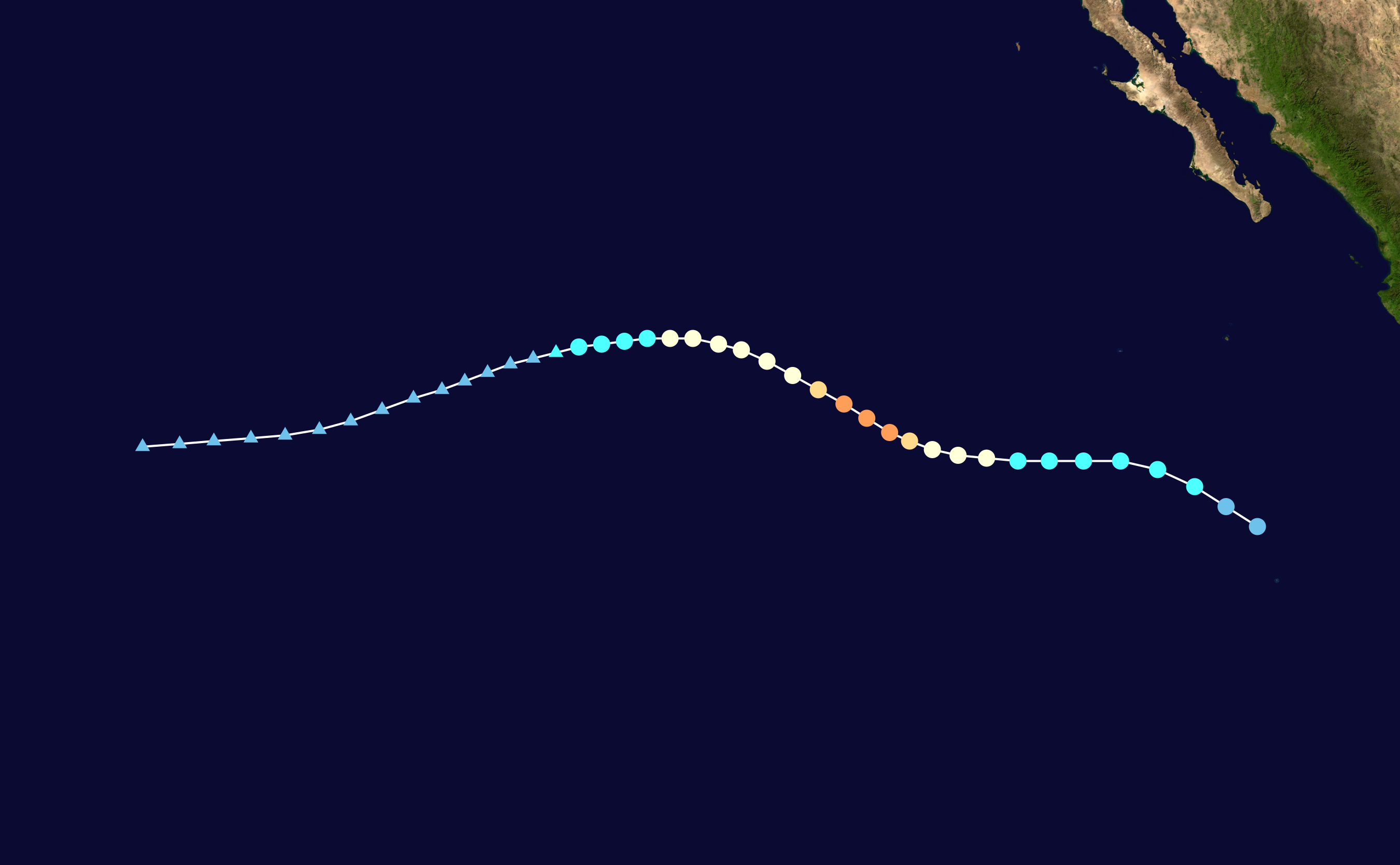
- Duration: August 6 – August 12
- Peak intensity: 120 mph (195 km/h) (1-min); 956 mbar (hPa)

On July 24, a tropical wave exited the west coast of Africa, which traversed the Atlantic Ocean and eventually entered the eastern Pacific on August 2. There, it interacted with a broad area of cyclonic flow south of Mexico. Its associated convection increased and organized around a low-pressure area. On August 6, the NHC designated the system as Tropical Depression Nine-E about 775 mi (1,245 km) south-southwest of the southern tip of Baja California Sur. A ridge over Mexico steered the depression to the northwest and later in a general westward direction. On August 7, the NHC upgraded the depression to Tropical Storm Hernan. Although Hernan was located over warm waters, moderate wind shear prevented the storm from intensifying quickly. An eye feature formed as wind shear diminished, signaling that Hernan intensified into a hurricane on August 8. After the eye became more defined, Hernan was upgraded to a major hurricane on August 9, reaching peak winds of 120 mph (195 km/h).

After reaching its peak, Hernan underwent an eyewall replacement cycle while also moving over cooler waters; this caused the hurricane to weaken. The new eye deteriorated as the outflow diminished. Early on August 11, Hernan was downgraded to a tropical storm. Deep convection diminished around the center of the storm and by August 12, almost all of the deep convection dissipated as Hernan continued to weaken. On August 13, Hernan degenerated into a remnant low after it lost its remaining thunderstorms. The low continued to the west-southwest over the next several days before dissipating 460 mi (740 km) southeast of the Island of Hawaii on August 16. The remnant low-pressure area of Hernan later brought moisture to the island of Hawaii, causing cloud and shower activity. The associated rainfall was light and insignificant.

=== Tropical Storm Kika ===
- Tropical storm (SSHWS)
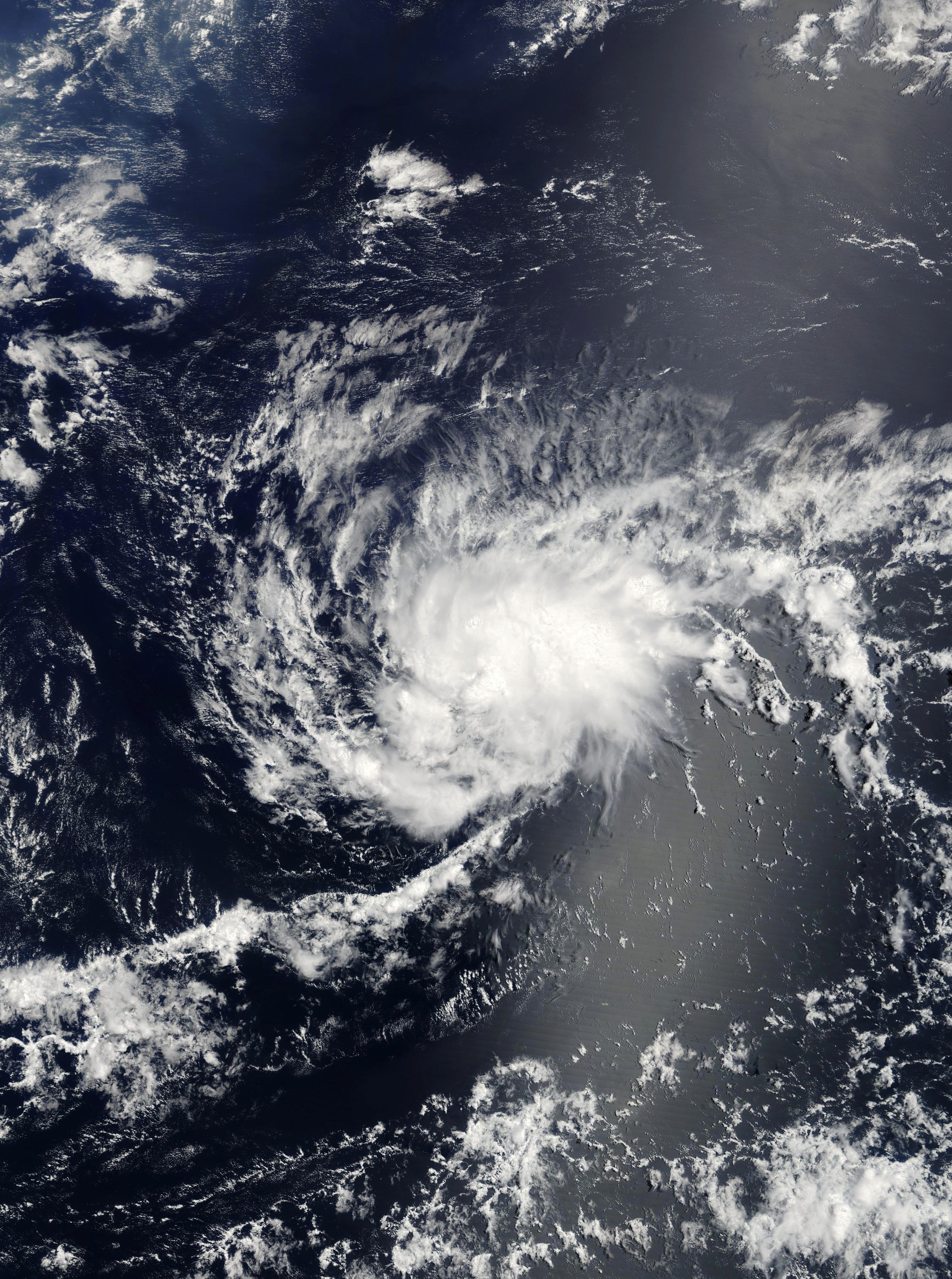
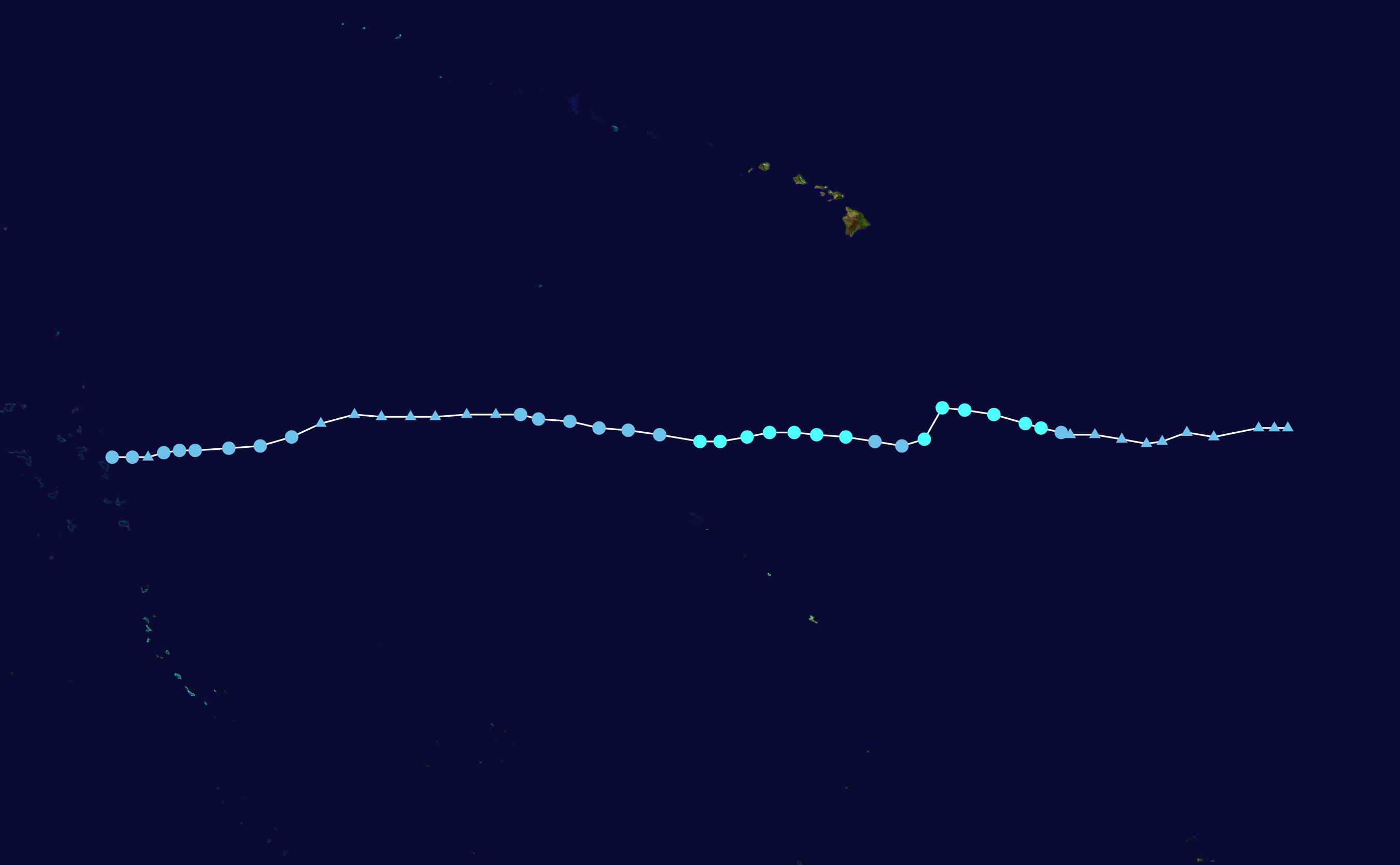
- Duration: August 7 – August 12 (Crossed basin)
- Peak intensity: 40 mph (65 km/h) (1-min); 1007 mbar (hPa)

On the morning of August 5, the CPHC began monitoring an area of low pressure 1,200 mi (1,900 km) east-southeast of Hilo, Hawaii; the system became better organized later in the day as the system was classified as a tropical disturbance and was declared Tropical Depression One-C on August 7 850 mi (1,370 km) southeast of Hilo, Hawaii. One-C was being steered toward the west due to easterly trade winds caused by large subtropical high-pressure area located northeast of Hawaii. The depression was quickly upgraded to Tropical Storm Kika later that night. Despite strong wind shear, the storm was expected to attain winds at 60 mph (95 km/h). However, this did not occur. After turning west-northwest and attaining peak intensity, Kika became less organized the following morning and the CPHC subsequently downgraded it to a tropical depression. After a revival in convection Kika was re-upgraded to a tropical storm again that evening. Even though wind shear was significantly diminishing, the storm became even less organized was moving over cooling water. Late on August 9, Kika weakened to a tropical depression once more, but was briefly re-upgraded into a tropical storm as it became better organized very late that night. By August 10, only isolated bursts of thunderstorms had remained around the center; as such, Kika was downgraded into a tropical depression. After a brief increase in thunderstorm activity, one Tropical cyclone forecast model showed Kika reaching hurricane status. Kika degenerated into a remnant low-pressure area that night 400 mi (645 km) away from the Johnston Atoll. The remnant low was last noted on August 14 as it crossed the International Date Line, out of the Central Pacific Hurricane Center's area of responsibility.

=== Tropical Storm Iselle ===
- Tropical storm (SSHWS)
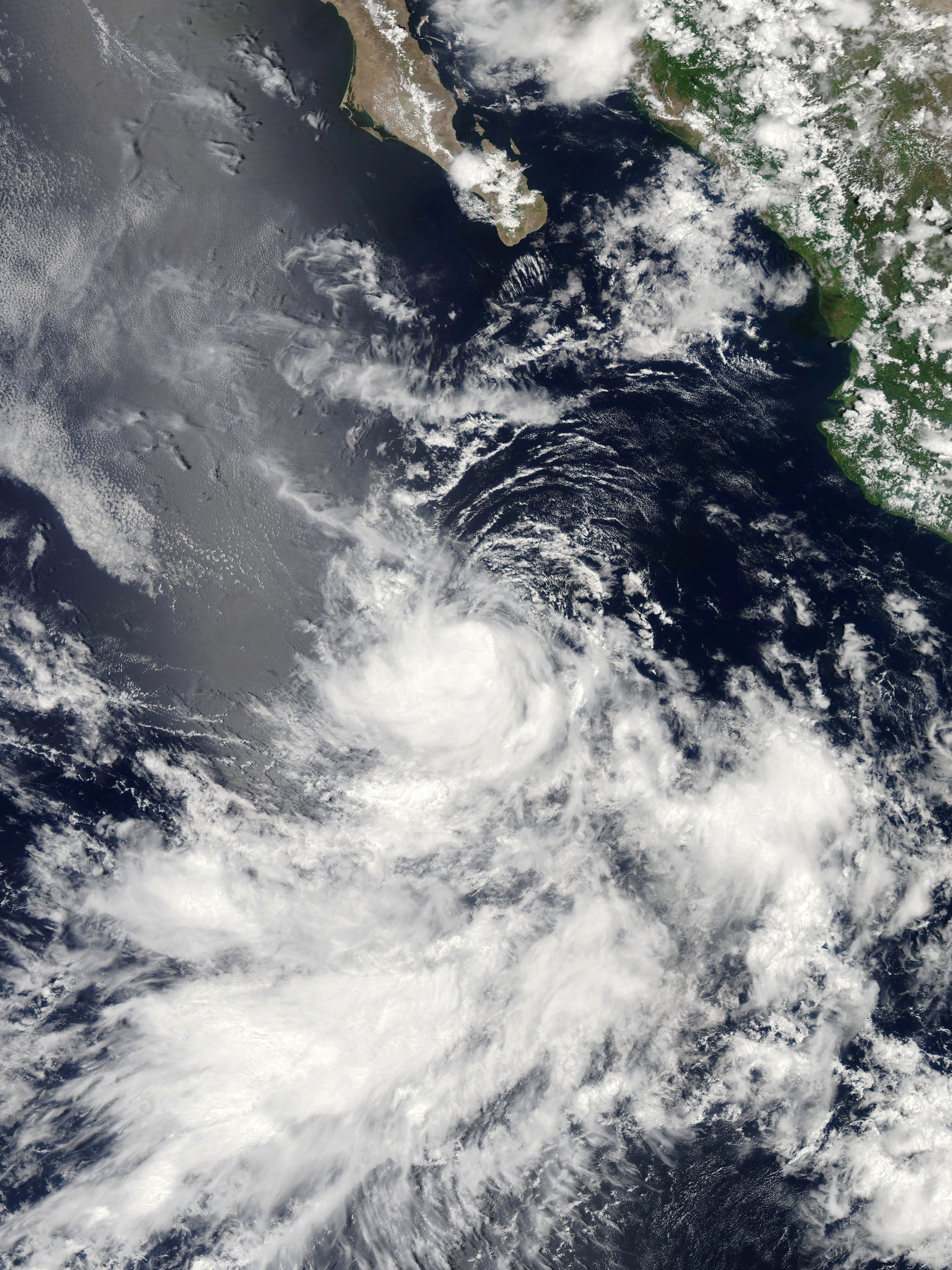
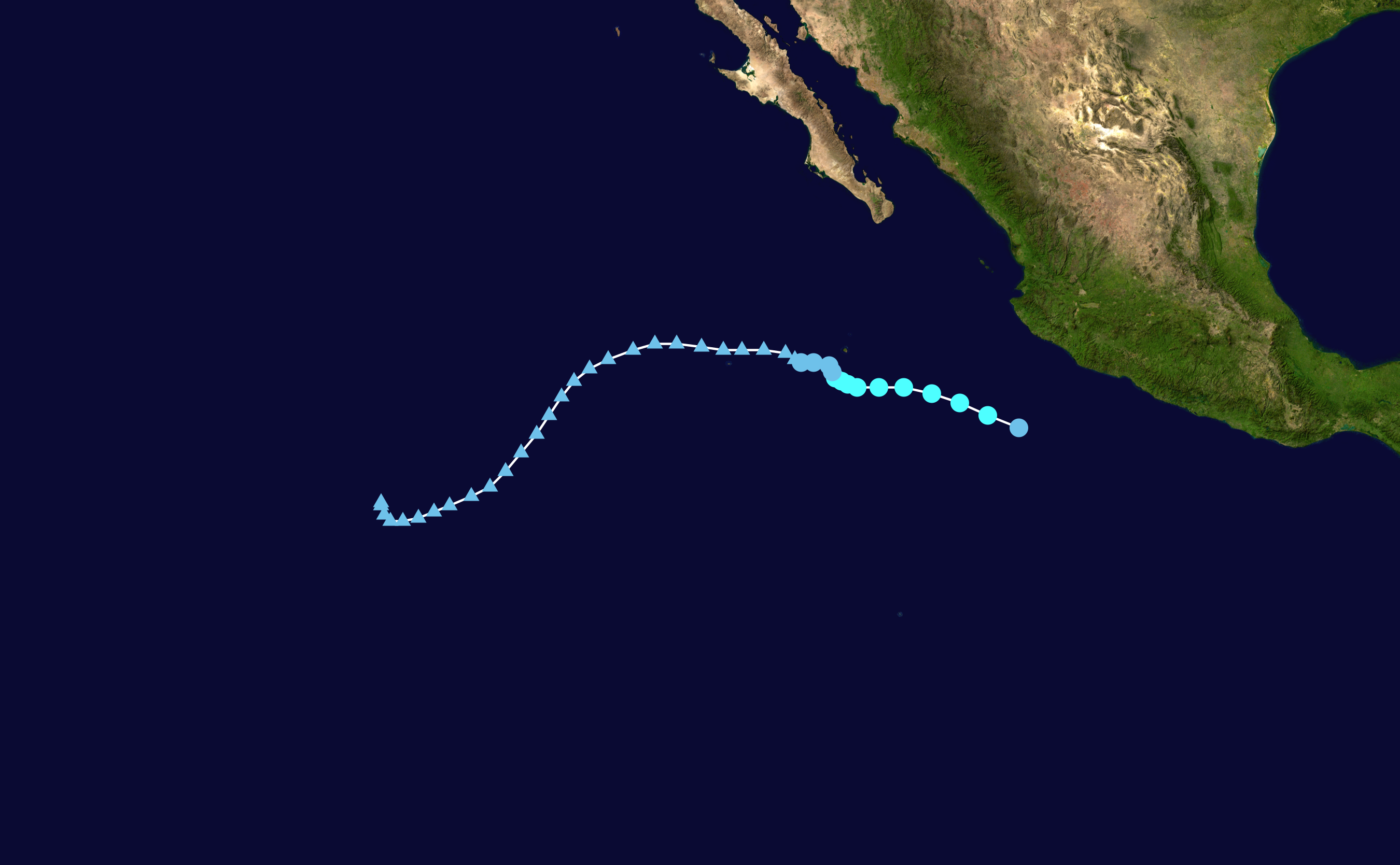
- Duration: August 13 – August 16
- Peak intensity: 50 mph (85 km/h) (1-min); 999 mbar (hPa)

A tropical wave left Africa on July 30 and began to show signs of organization as it crossed Central America early on August 8. It temporarily weakened thereafter, but began to coalesce again late on August 12; by 12:00 UTC the next morning, it had developed into a tropical depression. Six hours later, the depression intensified into Tropical Storm Iselle. High pressure to its north directed Iselle on a northwest trajectory, while moderate easterly wind shear limited the storm peak to 50 mph (80 km/h) on the morning of August 14. Increasing upper-level winds, cooler waters, and entrainment of dry air all hindered the system, causing it to weaken to a tropical depression around 00:00 UTC on August 16 and degenerate to a remnant low a day later. The low moved south and west before dissipating on August 23.

=== Tropical Storm Julio ===
- Tropical storm (SSHWS)
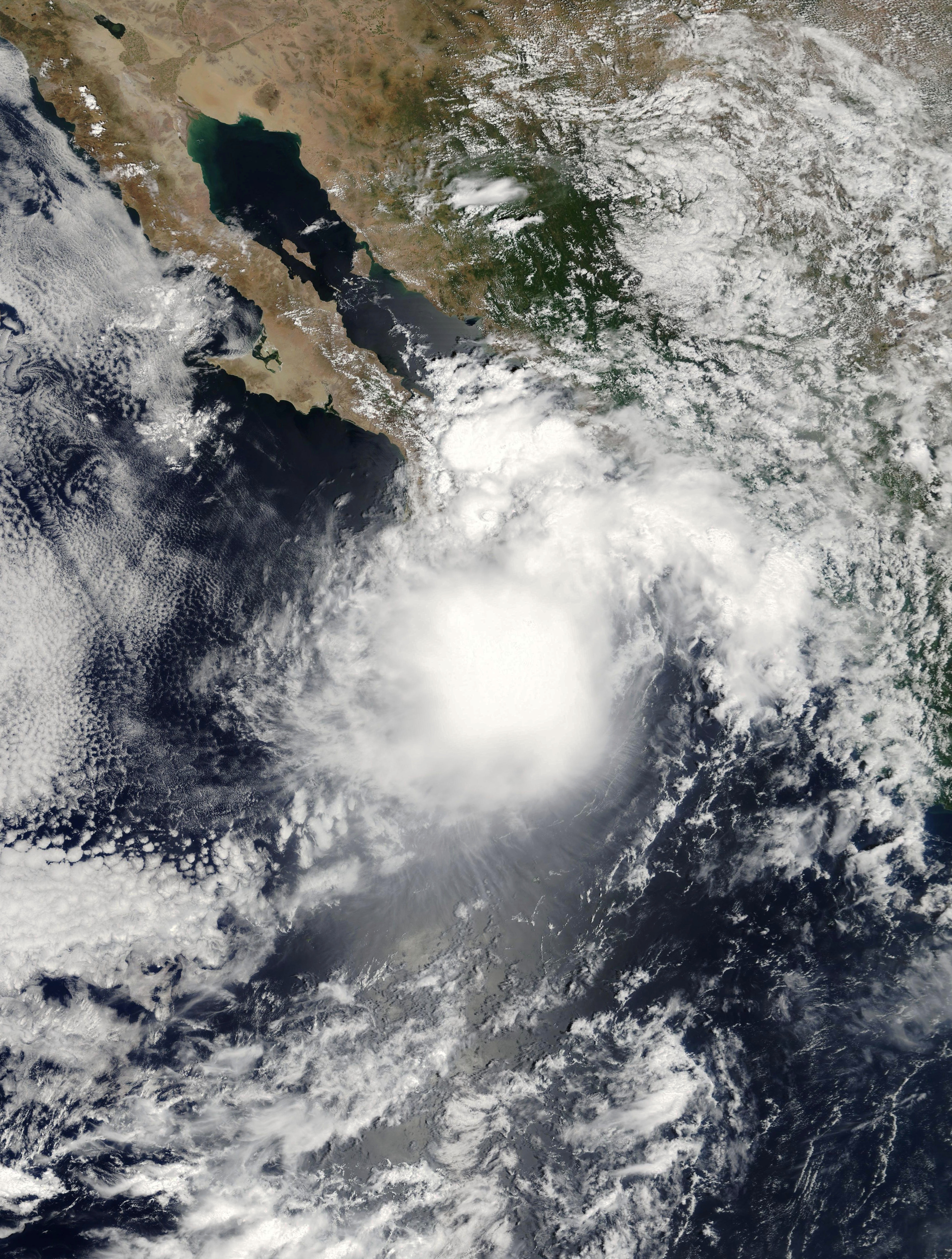
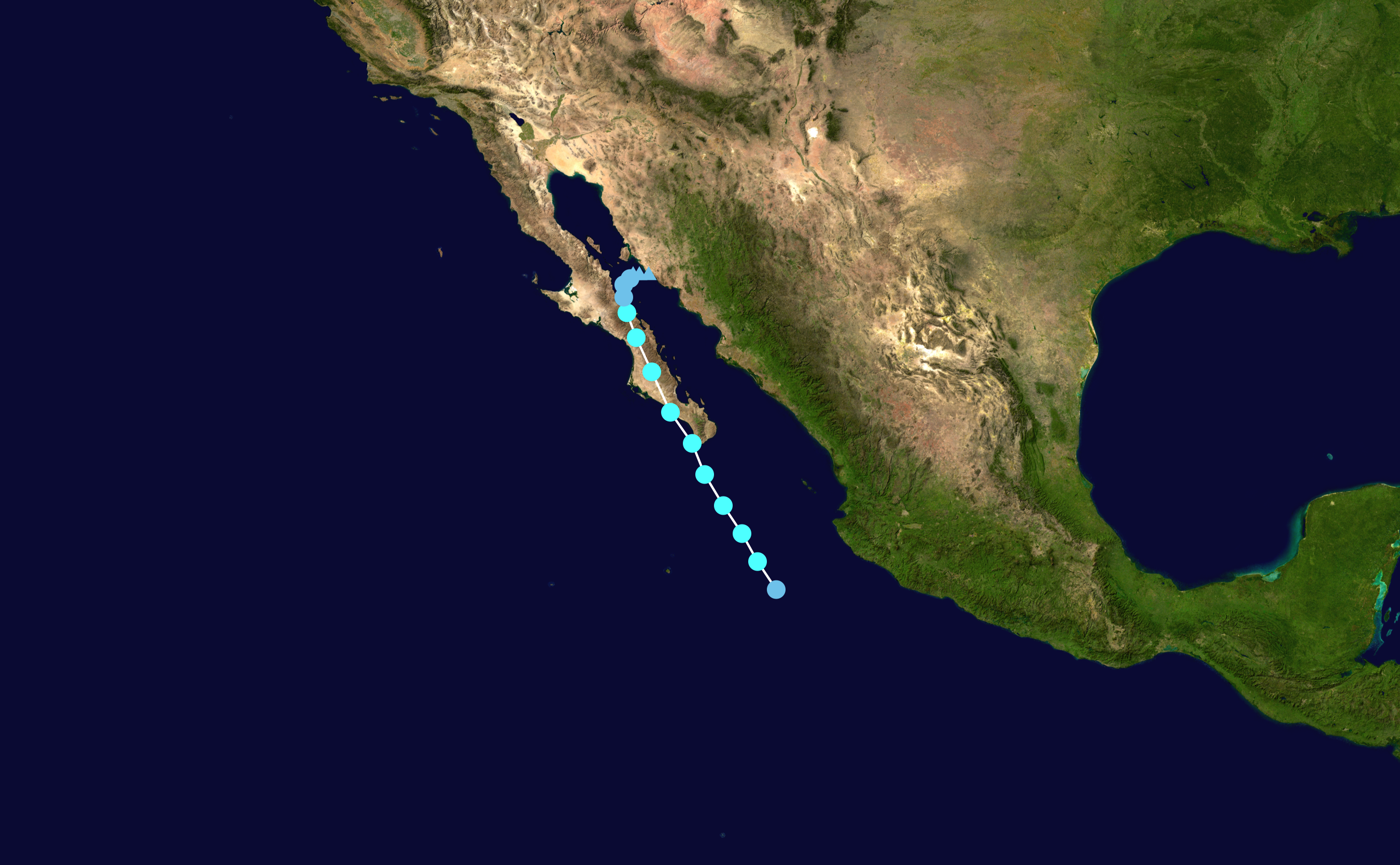
- Duration: August 23 – August 26
- Peak intensity: 50 mph (85 km/h) (1-min); 998 mbar (hPa)

A tropical wave moved off Africa on August 6, first spawning Tropical Storm Fay in the Atlantic. It continued into the eastern Pacific on August 17, and began to organize several days later. Tropical Depression Eleven-E formed around 12:00 UTC on August 23, located about 345 miles (555 km) south-southeast of the southern tip of the Baja California Peninsula. Six hours later, it intensified into Tropical Storm Julio. An area of high pressure over Mexico directed the nascent cyclone north-northwest, while moderate upper-level winds prevented Julio from strengthening beyond 50 mph (80 km/h). Around 00:00 UTC on August 25, the storm made landfall approximately 40 mi (65 km) west-southwest of La Paz, Baja California Sur, with winds of 45 mph (70 km/h). Slow weakening occurred as Julio entered the Gulf of California, and it fell to tropical depression intensity around 00:00 UTC on August 26 before degenerating to a remnant low eighteen hours later. The low drifted east before dissipating on the coast of mainland Mexico by 12:00 UTC on August 27.

Tropical storm warnings and watches were issued for southern portions of the Baja California peninsula. Prior to Julio making landfall, more than 2,500 families in susceptible areas left their homes to storm shelters. As Julio made landfall, it produced lightning and locally heavy rainfall, which killed one person. The floods left more than a dozen communities isolated and damaged several houses. Winds were generally light, although strong enough to damage a few electrical poles and small buildings. More than 39 sections of a highway were damaged. A state of emergency was declared in three municipalities following the storm. More than 70,000 residents were left isolated. In Mulegé, residents sought refuge on the rooftops of homes. Fifteen schools were flooded, affecting over 170,000 students. However, the Los Cabos Municipality, rainfall from the storm was considered beneficial, helping replenish aquifers. In Chihuahua, 16 neighborhoods and 200 homes were flooded. More than 40 vehicles and 23 people were swept away by floodwaters. Two deaths were reported in the state. A bridge collapsed, cutting off a highway that led to Parral. Moisture from Julio developed thunderstorms across Arizona, including one near Chandler which produced winds of 75 mph (120 km/h); the storm damaged ten small planes at Chandler Municipal Airport, as well as a hangar. The storms also dropped light rainfall, reaching over 1 inch (25 mm) in Gilbert, which caused flooding on Interstate 17. Strong winds downed three utility poles.

=== Tropical Storm Karina ===
- Tropical storm (SSHWS)
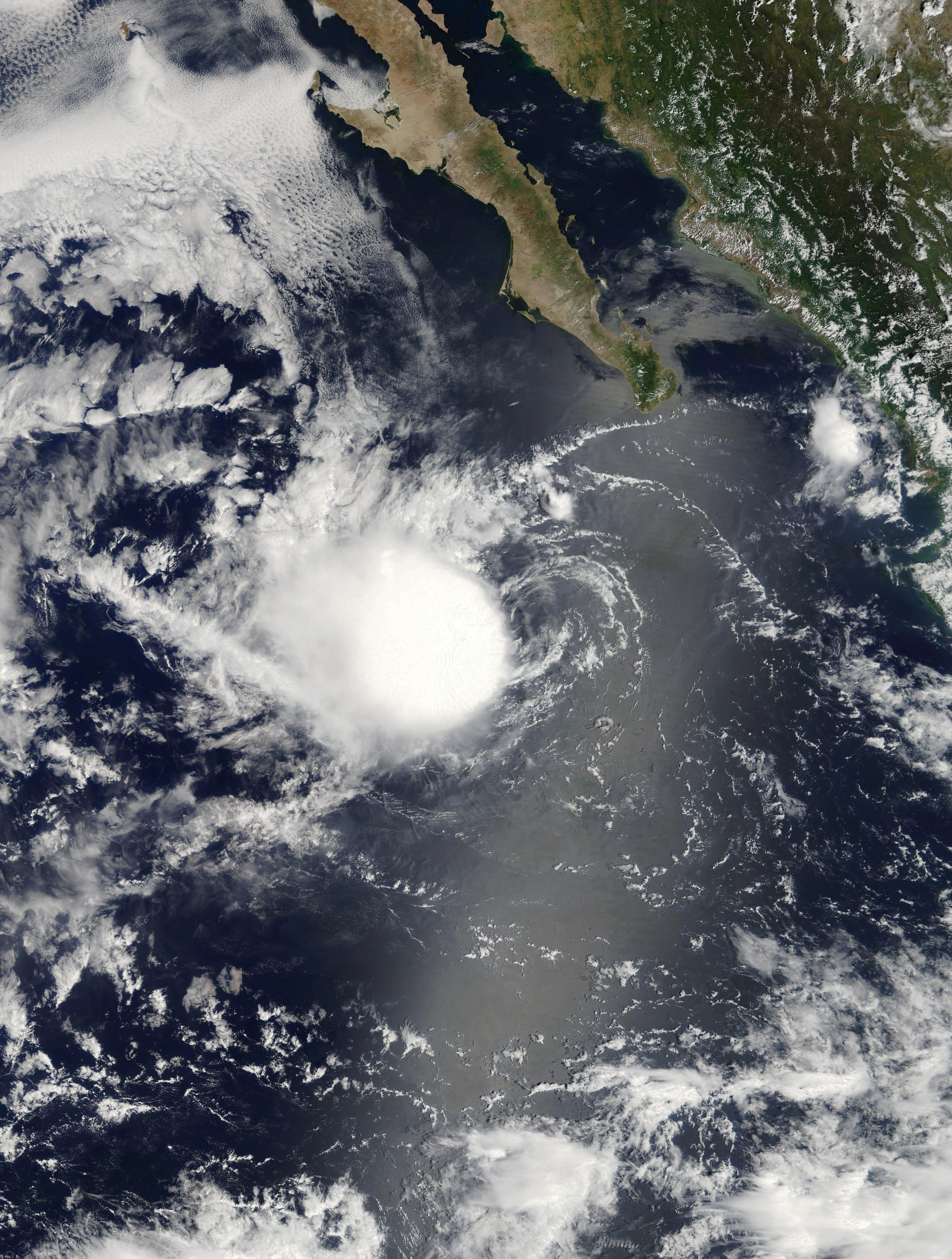
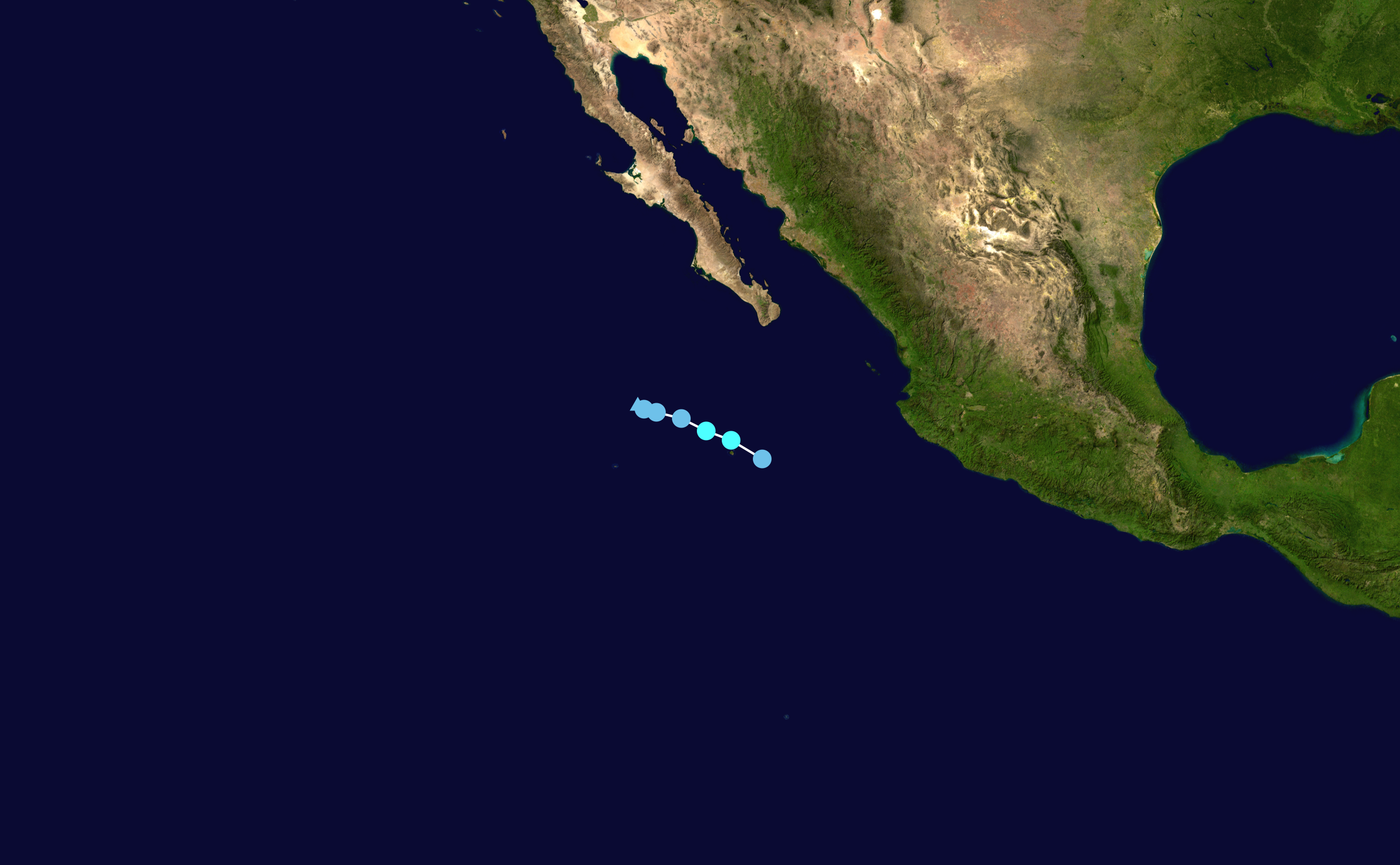
- Duration: September 2 – September 3
- Peak intensity: 40 mph (65 km/h) (1-min); 1000 mbar (hPa)

A tropical wave, the same that spawned Hurricane Gustav while in the Atlantic, crossed Central America on August 28. Convection slowly increased as it moved westward, and an area of low pressure developed just south of the Mexico coastline on August 30. Despite strong easterly wind shear, shower and thunderstorm activity formed close enough to the center for the disturbance to become a tropical depression around 06:00 UTC on September 2. A brief relaxation in upper-level winds allowed the depression to intensify into Tropical Storm Karina six hours later before wind shear once again increased, leading to a steady weakening trend and degeneration to a remnant low by 18:00 UTC on September 3.

=== Tropical Storm Lowell ===
- Tropical storm (SSHWS)
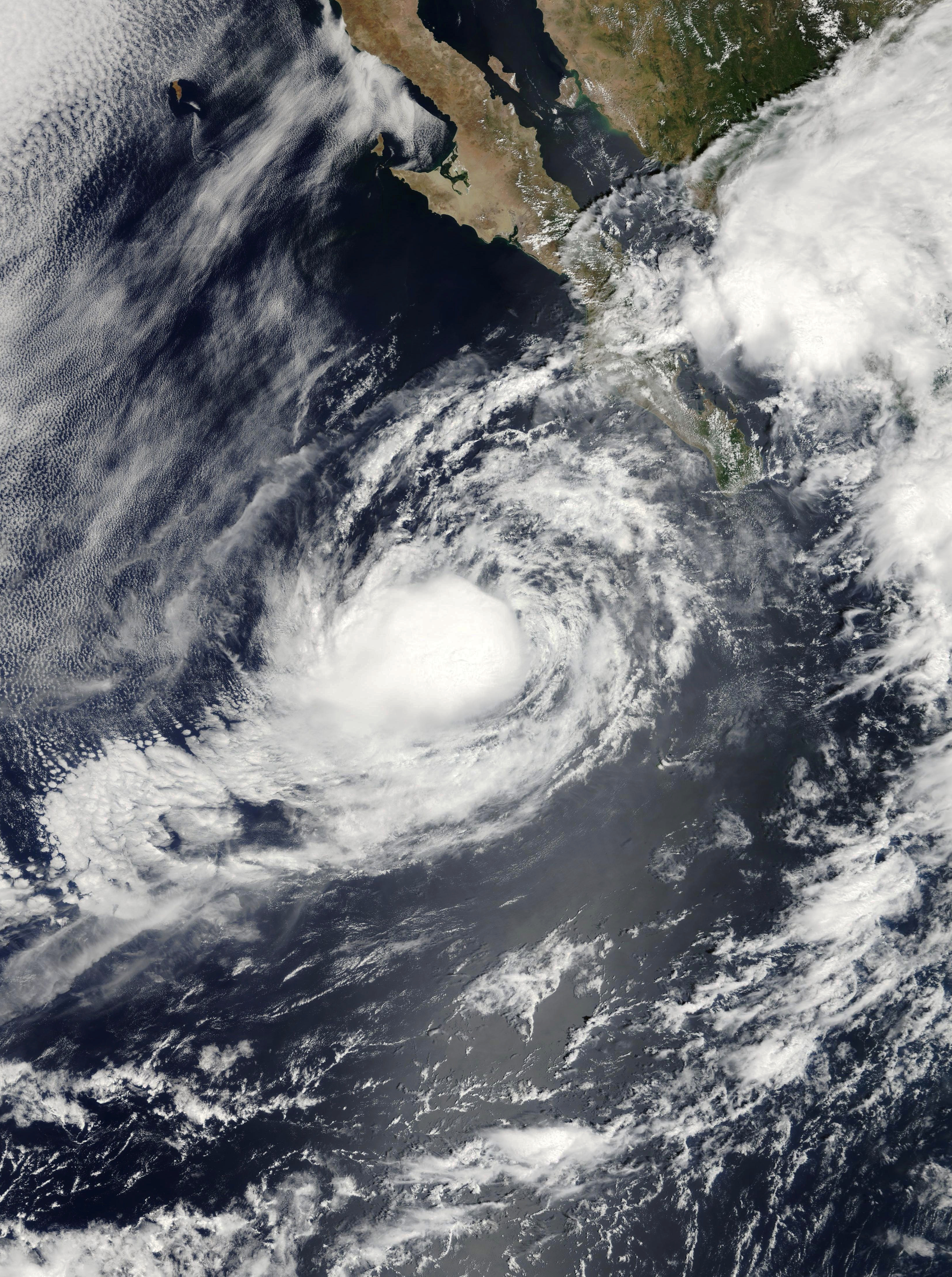
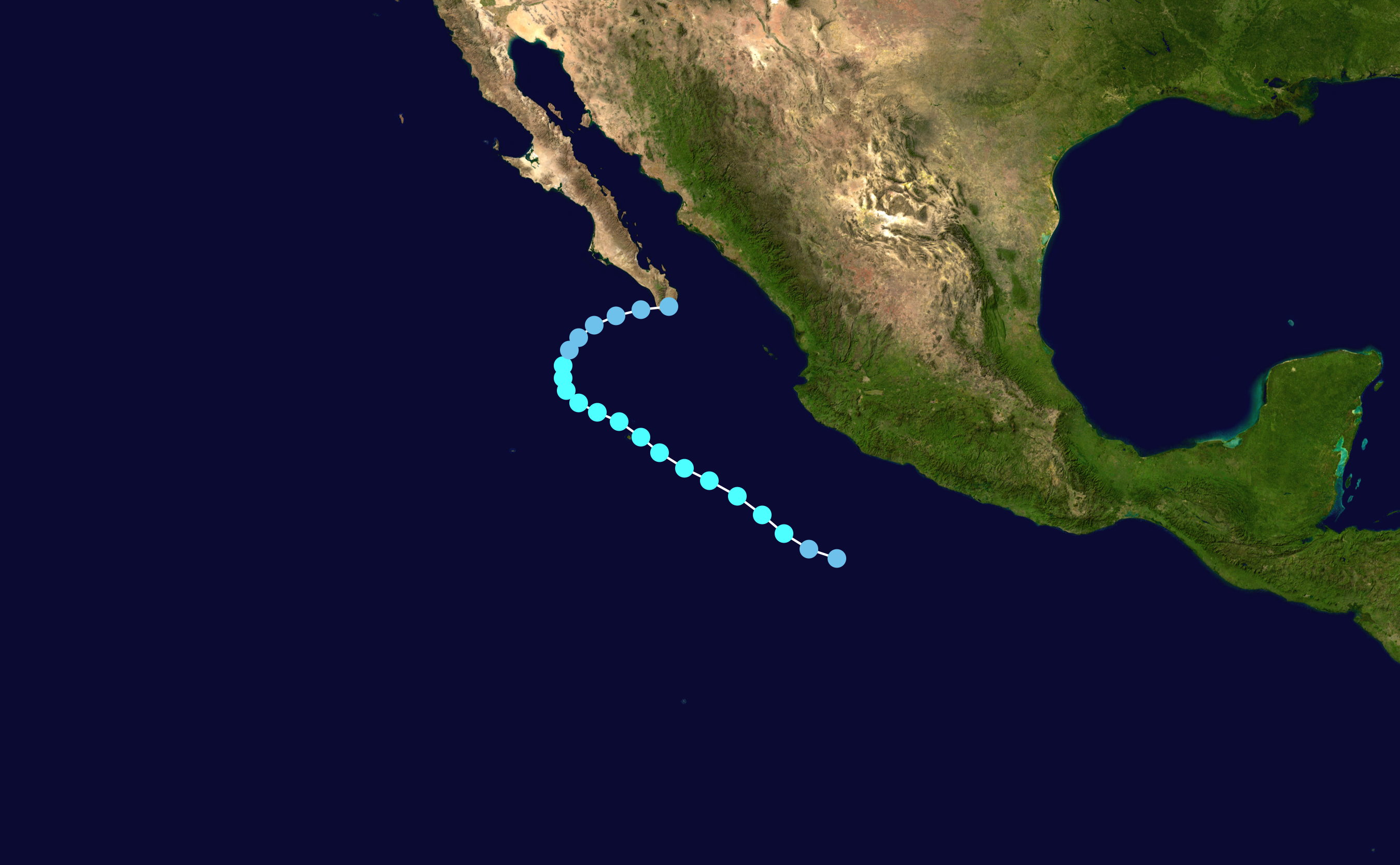
- Duration: September 6 – September 11
- Peak intensity: 50 mph (85 km/h) (1-min); 998 mbar (hPa)

A tropical wave emerged from Africa on August 19, the northern half of which spawned Hurricane Hanna, while the second half continued west. It entered the East Pacific by August 28, interacting with a broad cyclonic gyre spawned by a pre-existing surface trough in the region. As the wave reached the western edge of the gyre, it formed an area of low pressure that further organized into a tropical depression around 12:00 UTC on September 6. It intensified into Tropical Storm Lowell twelve hours later. The cyclone moved along the western periphery of an anticyclone over Mexico, and this feature imparted strong upper-level winds on Lowell that limited its peak strength to 50 mph (80 km/h). Wind shear eventually slackened, but the storm progressed into a drier environment and began to weaken. After falling to tropical depression intensity, Lowell turned east and made landfall near Cabo San Lucas around 09:00 UTC on September 11. It opened up into an elongated surface trough nine hours later.

Lowell made landfall as a tropical depression in Baja California but its effects where felt at more inland areas. In Michoacán, Sonora, and Sinaloa, flooding from Lowell's remnants left more than 26,500 people homeless. No deaths were reported. Damage in Sonora totaled over 200 million pesos – US$15.5 million (value in 2008).

Moisture from Lowell eventually joined with a cold front and the remnants of Hurricane Ike and caused significant damage. As this conglomeration of moisture traveled through the United States it caused extensive flooding in Illinois. In Chicago it broke flooding records dating back to 1871.

=== Hurricane Marie ===
- Category 1 hurricane (SSHWS)
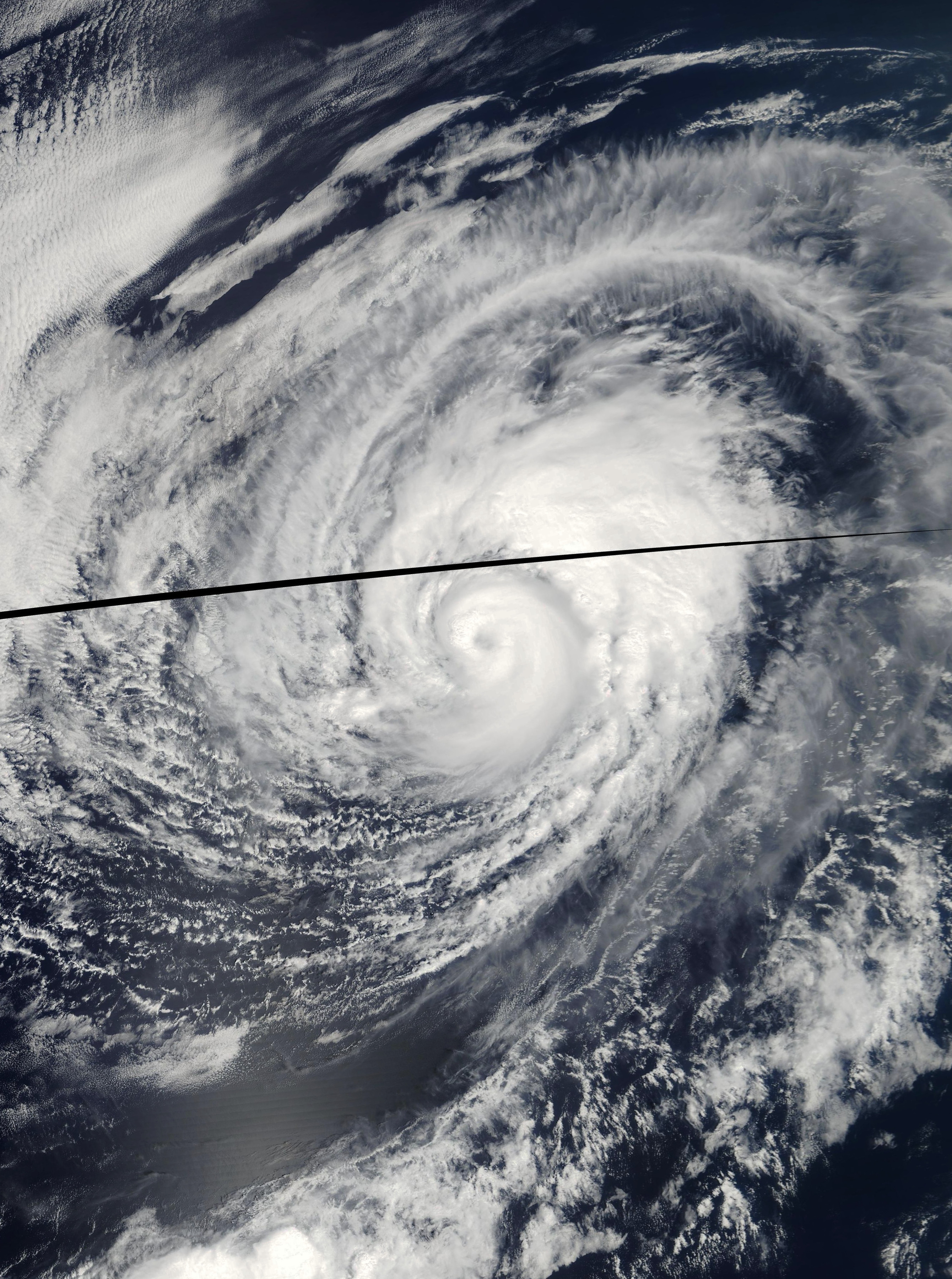
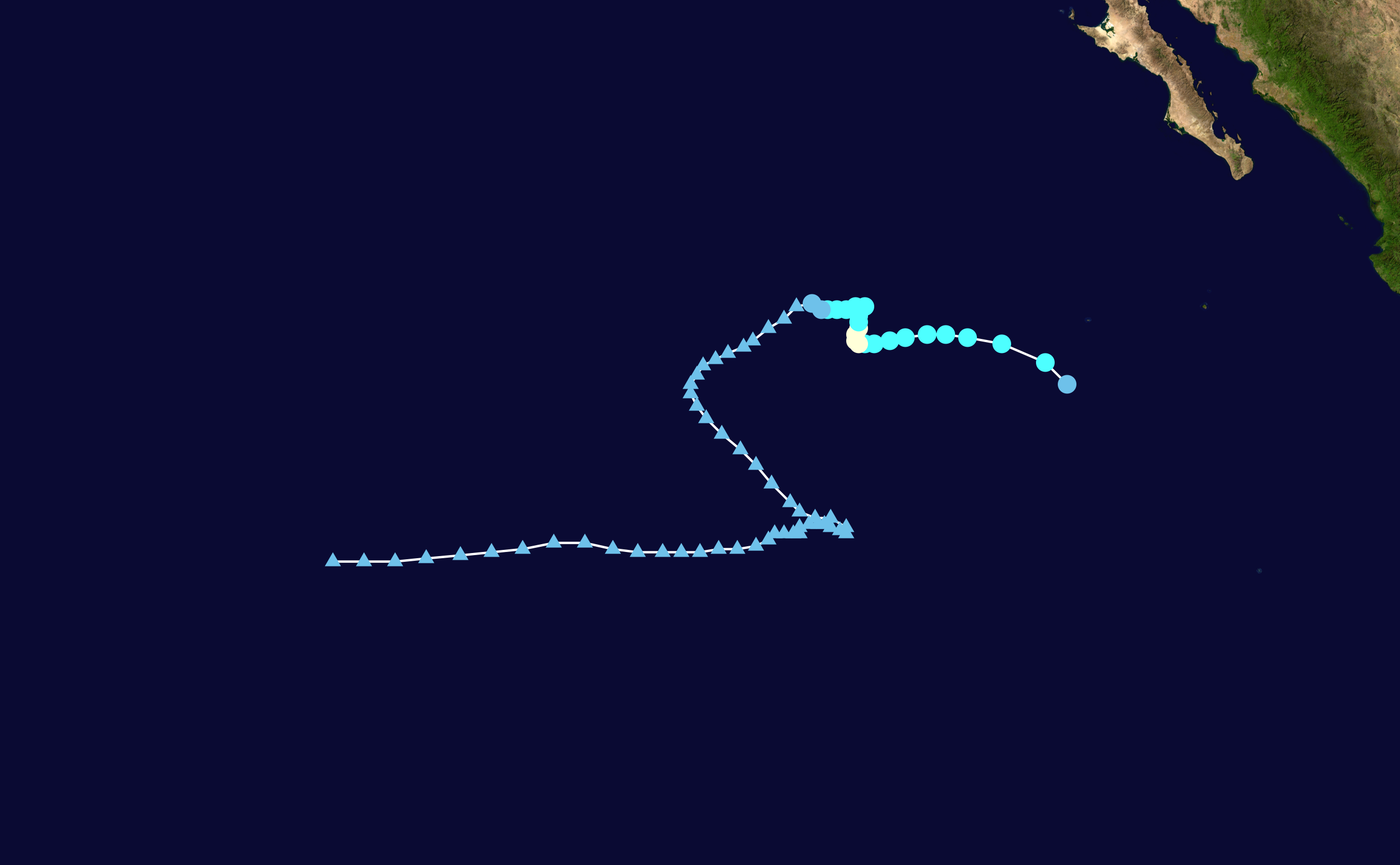
- Duration: October 1 – October 6
- Peak intensity: 80 mph (130 km/h) (1-min); 984 mbar (hPa)

Marie developed on October 1 from a tropical wave that departed Africa nearly a month earlier on September 6. The wave moved west through the tropical Atlantic and the Caribbean, before crossing Central America on September 24, still poorly organized. An area of low pressure formed on September 28, and it began a gradual organization trend that led to the formation of a tropical depression around 06:00 UTC on October 1, and to the designation of Tropical Storm Marie six hours later. With light upper-level winds, Marie began a period of quick intensification on October 3, bringing it to hurricane strength at 18:00 UTC that afternoon and to a peak of 80 mph (130 km/h) the next morning. The hurricane soon began to enter cooler ocean temperatures, prompting a gradual decline in intensity before Marie degenerated to a remnant low around 00:00 UTC on October 7. The tenacious post-tropical cyclone meandered for nearly two weeks before being absorbed into the Intertropical Convergence Zone on October 19.

=== Hurricane Norbert ===
- Category 4 hurricane (SSHWS)
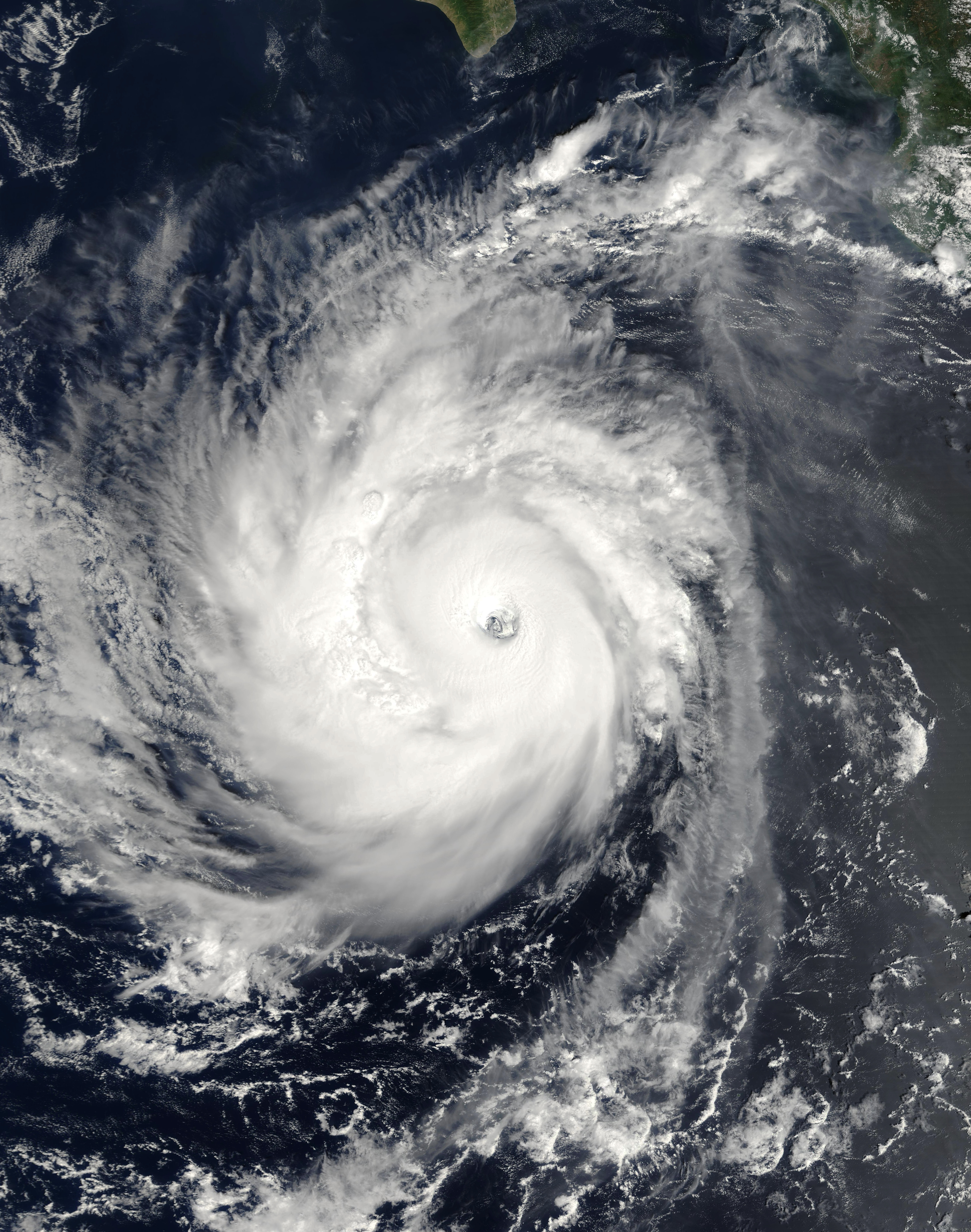
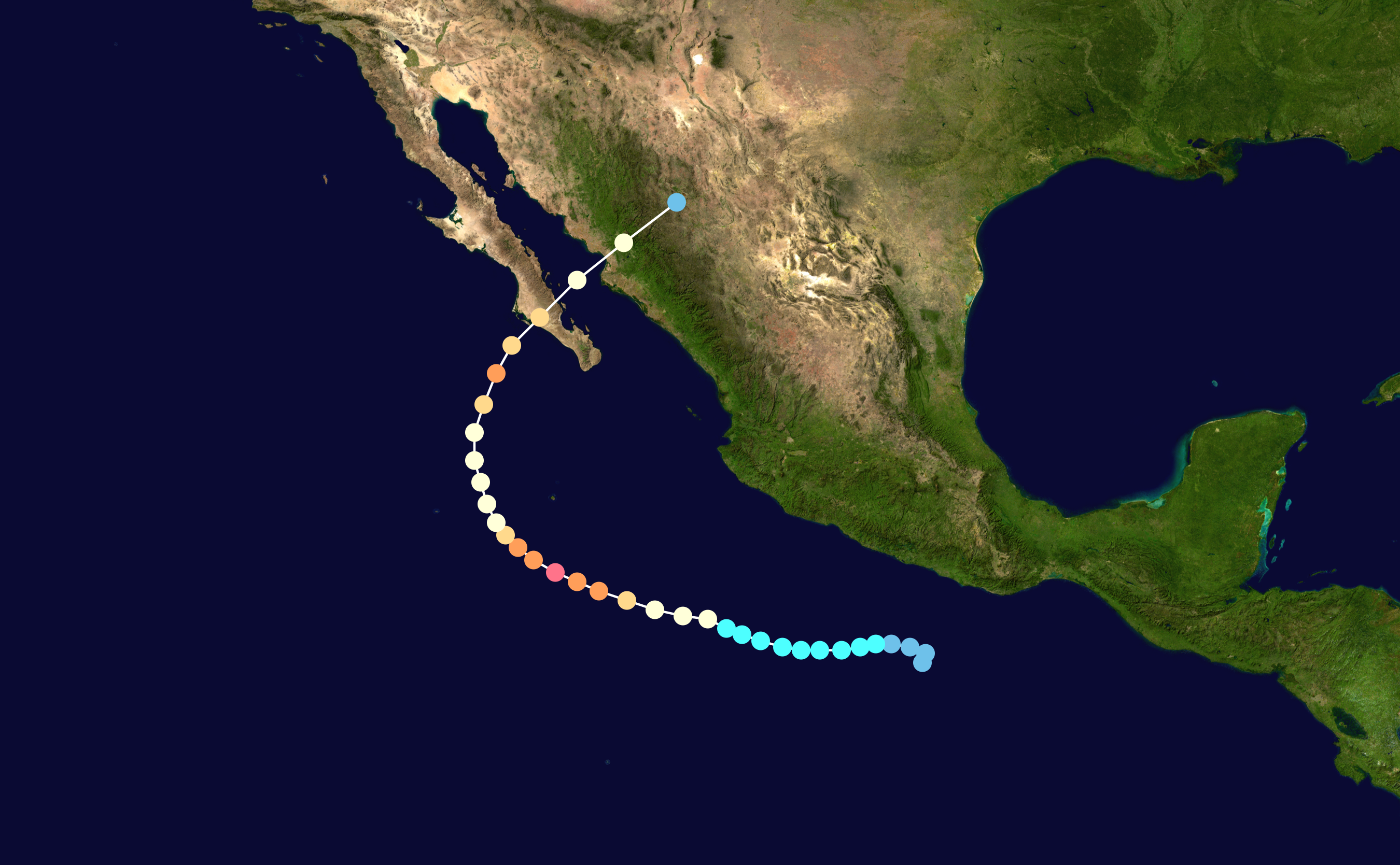
- Duration: October 4 – October 12
- Peak intensity: 130 mph (215 km/h) (1-min); 945 mbar (hPa)

The merging of two tropical waves resulted in the development of a tropical depression south of Mexico around 00:00 UTC on October 4. Steered by a mid-level ridge to its north, the depression gradually intensified, becoming Tropical Storm Norbert a day after formation and attaining hurricane strength around 06:00 UTC on October 7. The hurricane rounded the ridge and began to rapidly intensify, ultimately reaching its peak as a Category 4 hurricane with winds of 130 mph (210 km/h) near 18:00 UTC on October 8. An eyewall replacement cycle weakened Norbert to Category 1 strength late on October 9, but favorable environmental conditions allowed the system to re-attain major hurricane intensity around 06:00 UTC on October 11. Norbert made landfall just southeast of Bahía Magdalena, Baja California Sur, around 16:30 UTC on October 11 at a slightly reduced strength of 105 mph (170 km/h). An increase in wind shear caused the system to weaken to 85 mph (135 km/h) as it made a second landfall east-southeast of Huatabampo, Sonora, around 04:00 UTC on October 12. Norbert continued northeast and rapidly dissipated over the mountains of northeastern Mexico by 18:00 UTC.

Hurricane Norbert struck Mexico's Baja California peninsula with torrential rains and winds of up to 155 km/h. Strong winds bent palm trees along coastal areas. Some streets were in knee-deep water in the town of Puerto San Carlos. Norbert ripped off roofs, knocking down trees and left one person missing and more than 20,000 homes without electricity, local authorities say. Some 2850 people were housed in temporary shelters. Forty percent of homes were totally or partially damaged on the islands of Margarita and Magdalena, mainly having lost their roofs, said a report from state protection services. La Paz international airport suspended its activities at midday local time Saturday, but the tourist resort of Los Cabos remained open. Hotel reservations were down by around 40 per cent mainly in Los Cabos and Loreto, local tourism officials said.

Norbert was a Category 2 hurricane at landfall, which made Norbert the first October hurricane to strike the western Baja California peninsula since Hurricane Pauline forty years prior, and Norbert was the stronger of the two.

=== Tropical Storm Odile ===
- Tropical storm (SSHWS)
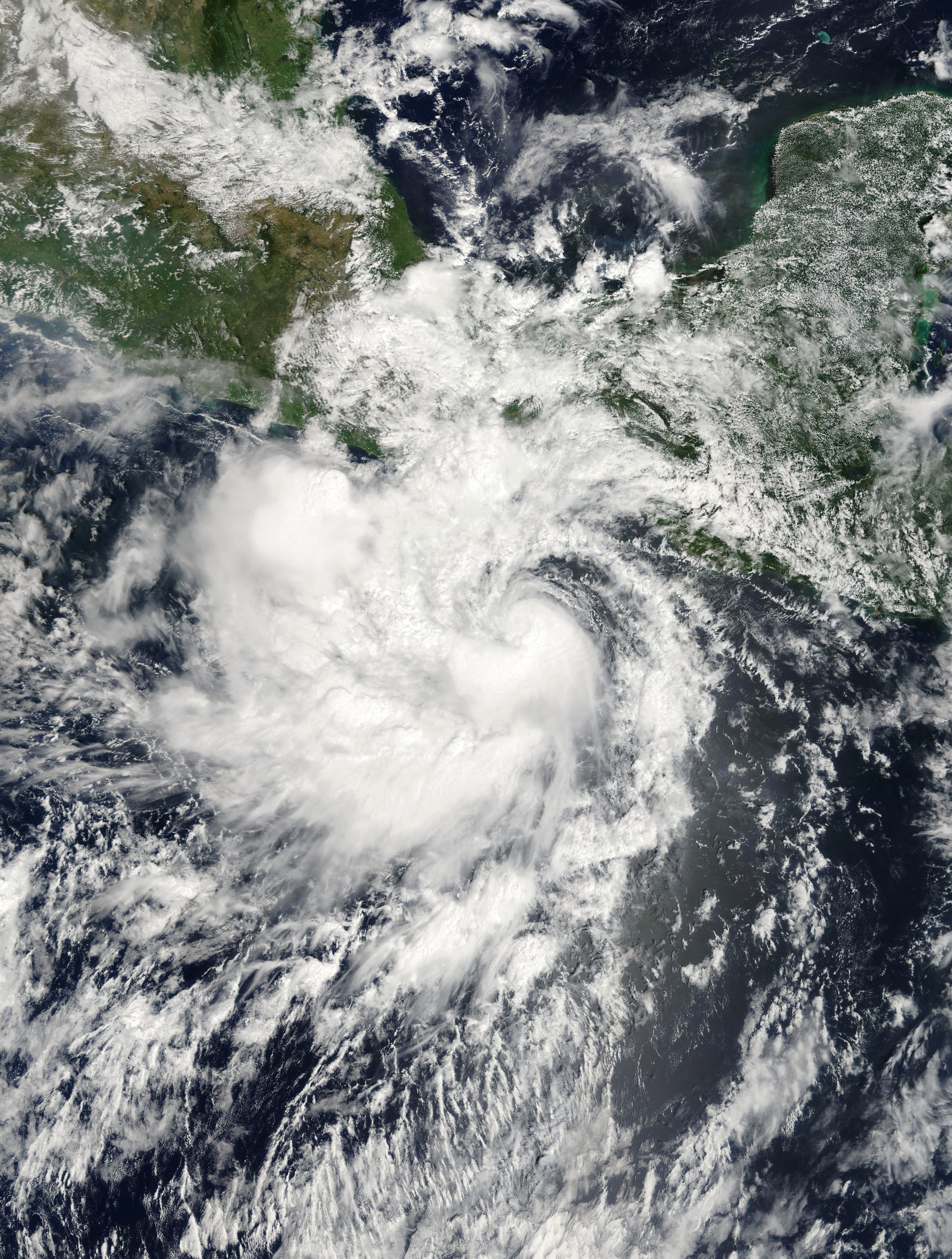
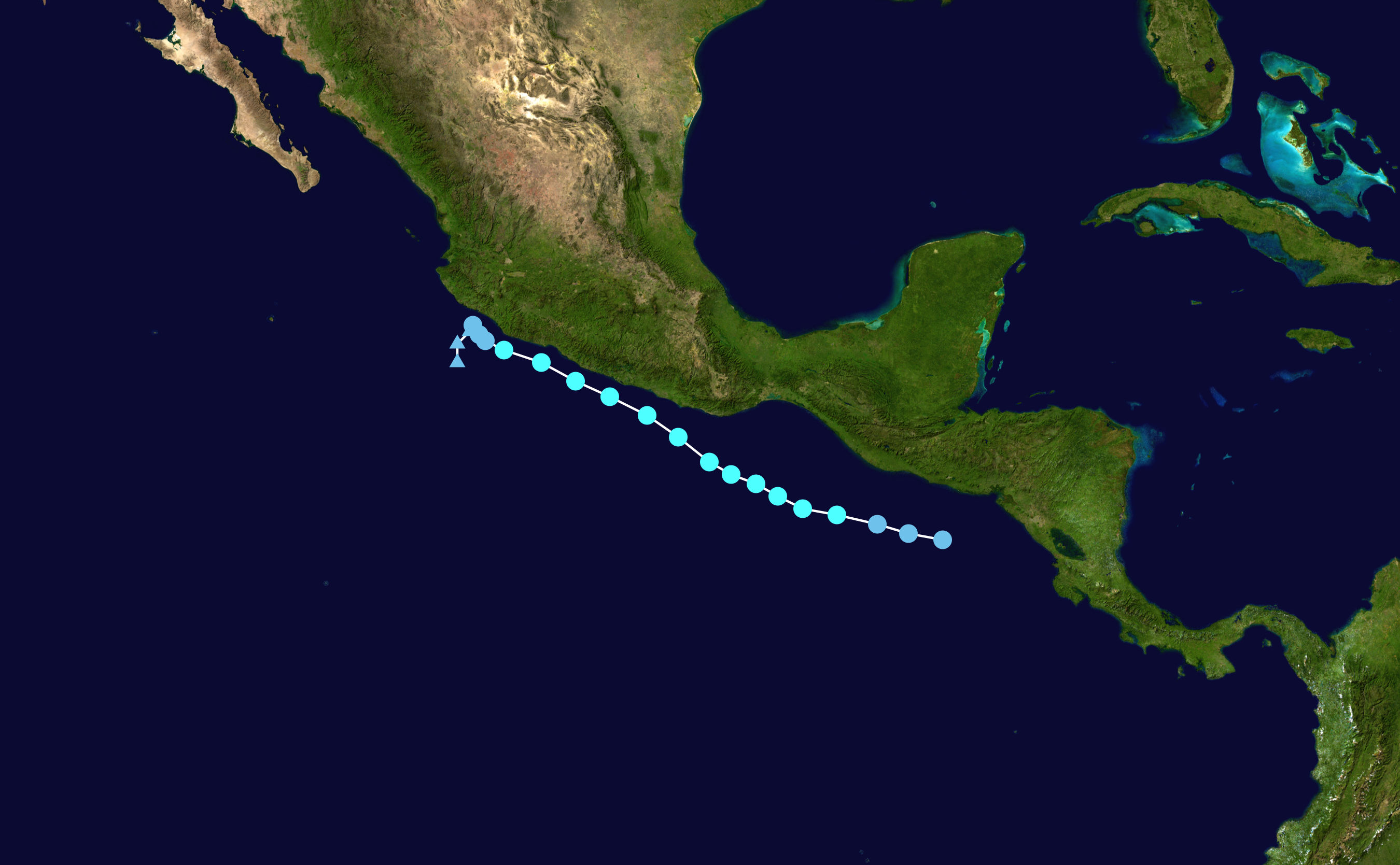
- Duration: October 8 – October 12
- Peak intensity: 60 mph (95 km/h) (1-min); 997 mbar (hPa)

A complex series of interactions between two tropical waves, a frontal system, and a pre-existing area of vorticity led to the formation of a tropical depression just west of El Salvador around 12:00 UTC on October 8. The system moved west-northwest as it developed, steered by a large ridge over Mexico. Light upper-level winds allowed the depression to intensify into Tropical Storm Odile by 06:00 UTC on October 9 and attain peak winds of 60 mph (95 km/h) by early the next day. After maintaining its intensity for over 24 hours, increasing southeasterly wind shear prompted a rapid weakening trend. Odile fell to tropical depression strength early on October 12 as it continued to parallel the coastline of Mexico, and it degenerated to a remnant low around 00:00 UTC on October 13. The post-tropical cyclone moved south-southwest and dissipated that day.

Eighteen hours after it was named, a Tropical Storm Watch was issued from Punta Maldonado to Zihuatanejo. It was replaced with a warning 12 hours later. Before becoming a tropical wave, the precursor disturbance to Odile dumped heavy rainfall on Nicaragua, although any impact is unknown. Odile also caused heavy rain in Mexico. The system caused floods in Acapulco, which left 12 homes damaged.

=== Tropical Depression Seventeen-E ===
- Tropical depression (SSHWS)
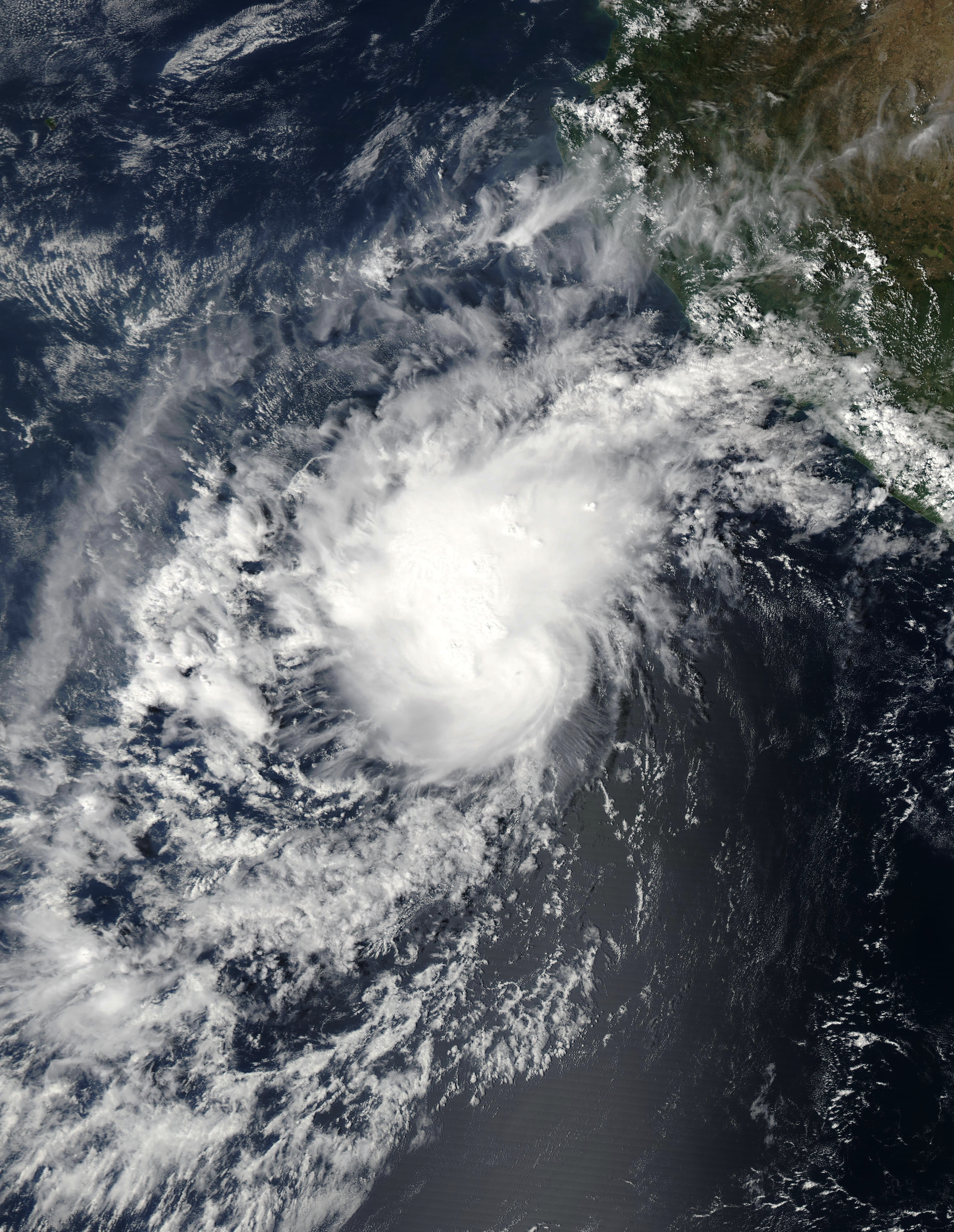
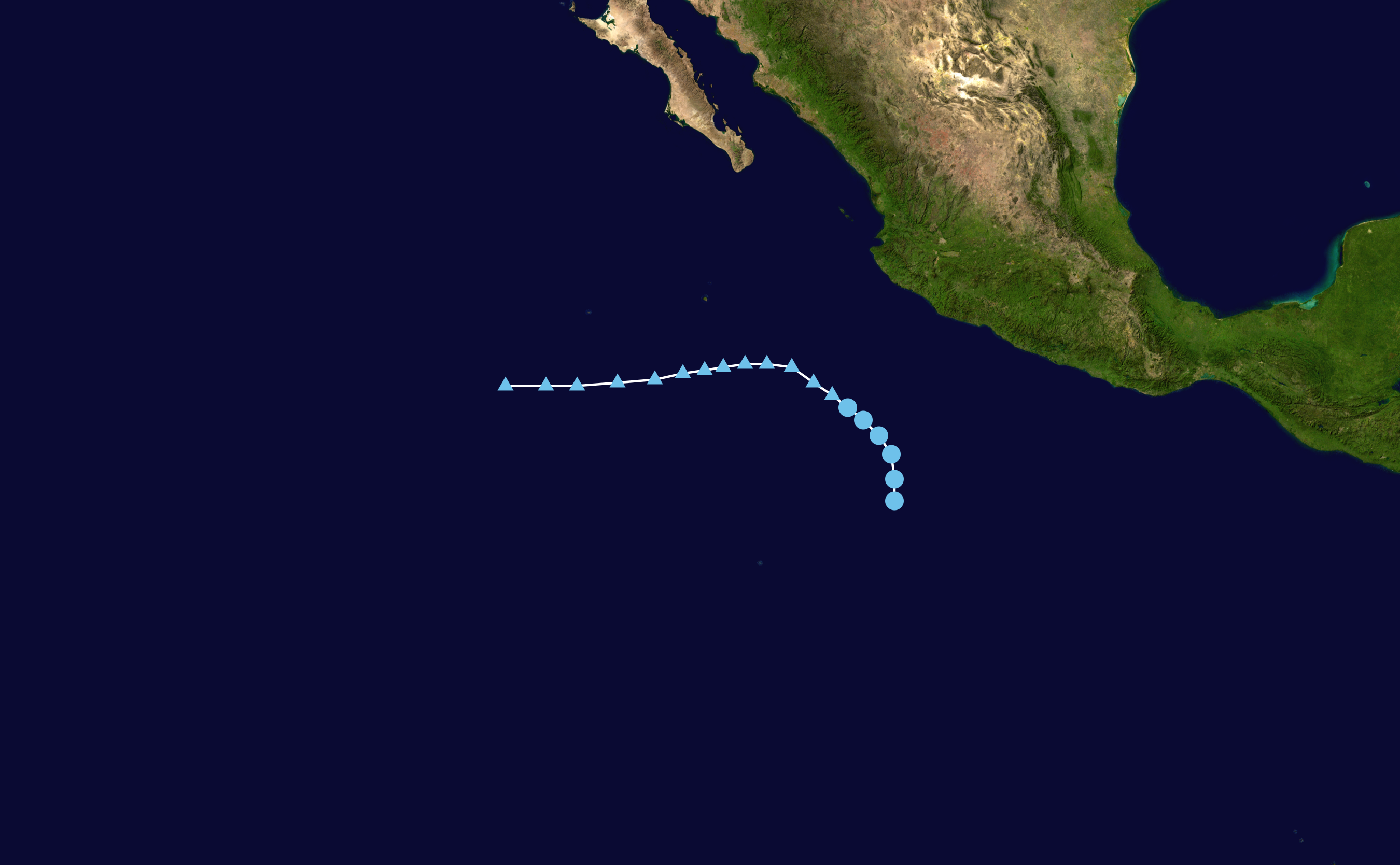
- Duration: October 23 – October 24
- Peak intensity: 35 mph (55 km/h) (1-min); 1008 mbar (hPa)

A slow-moving tropical wave left Africa on September 30 and crossed into the East Pacific by October 16. Convection developed and persisted as it continued west, leading to the formation of a tropical depression well south of Mexico around 06:00 UTC on October 23. As the newly formed cyclone reached the western periphery of a ridge over Mexico, it turned to the north. An approaching upper-level trough dictated the depression northwest early on October 24 while also imparting increasing upper-level winds; for this reason, deep convection never organized about the center of the system, and it failed to intensify into a tropical storm. By 18:00 UTC that day, it degenerated to a remnant area of low pressure. The post-tropical cyclone tracked west before dissipating early on October 28.

=== Tropical Storm Polo ===
- Tropical storm (SSHWS)
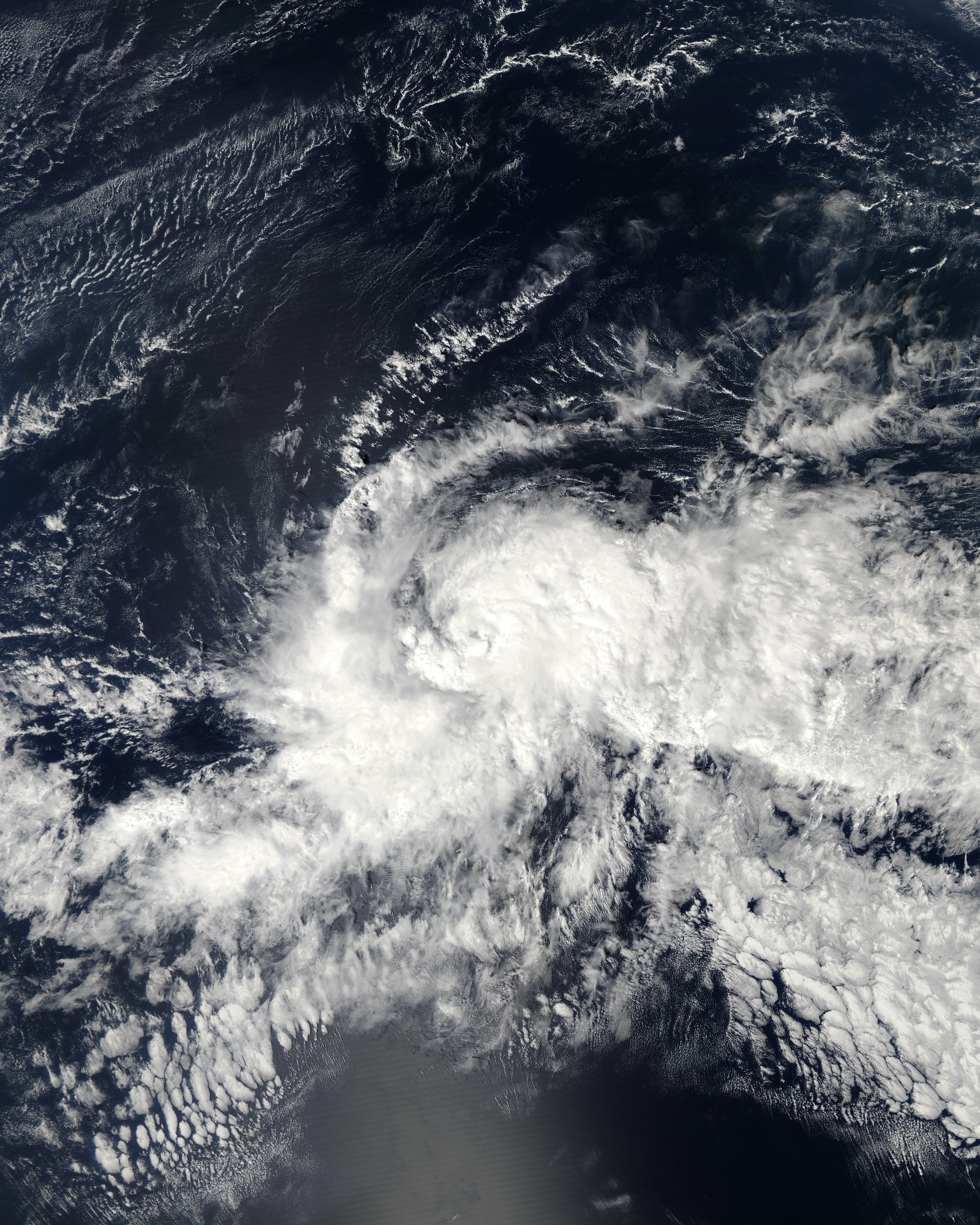
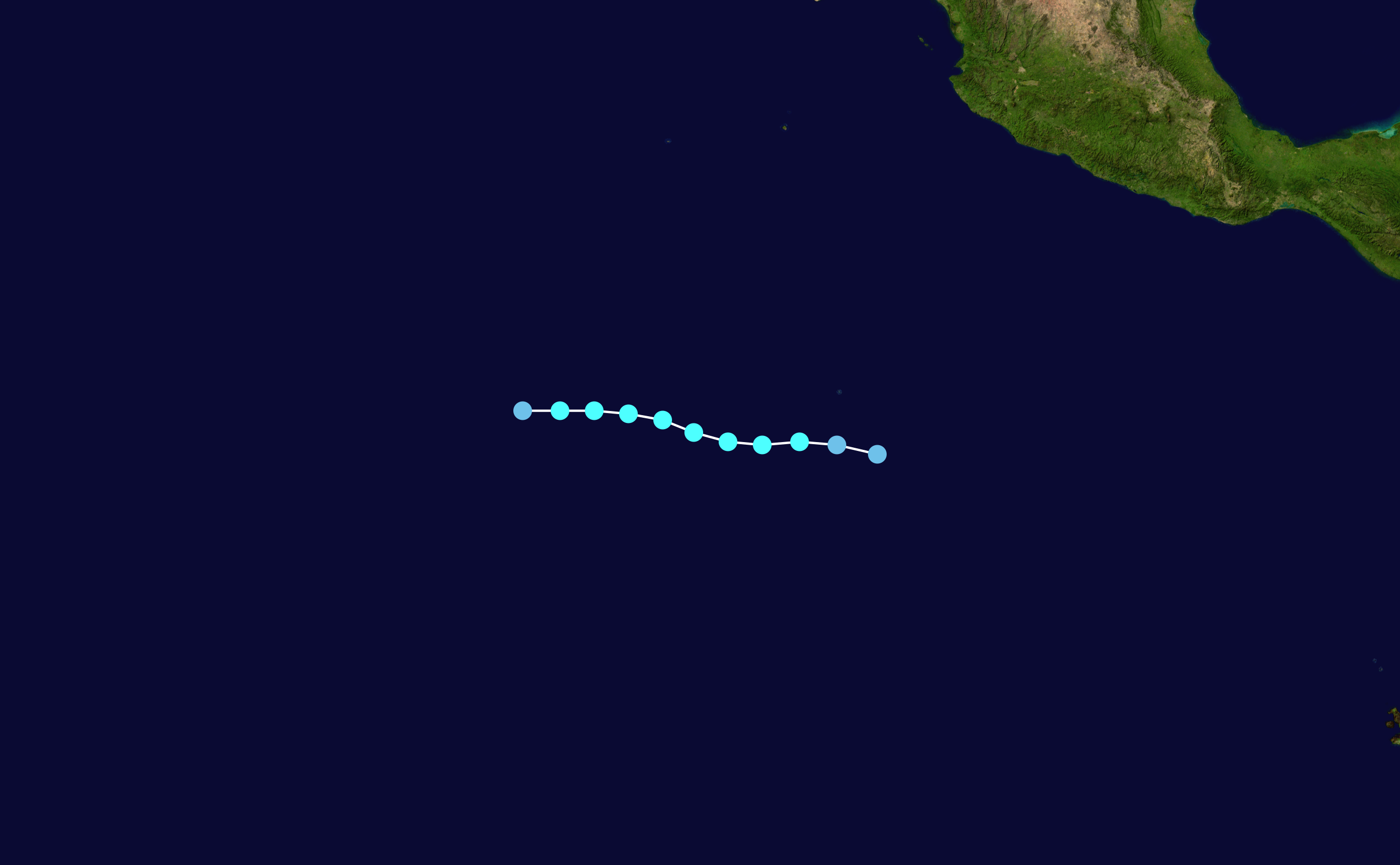
- Duration: November 2 – November 5
- Peak intensity: 45 mph (75 km/h) (1-min); 1003 mbar (hPa)

The final tropical cyclone of the 2008 season originated as a tropical wave that moved offshore Africa on October 15. The wave moved west and crossed Central America by October 29, subsequently merging with the ITCZ. A small area of low pressure developed along the wave axis, leading to the formation of a tropical depression around 12:00 UTC on November 2. Although the system never fully detached from the ITCZ, it intensified into Tropical Storm Polo twelve hours after formation, at an unusually low latitude. The development of a tiny eye-like feature signified the storm's peak strength of 45 mph (70 km/h) before increasing upper-level winds caused Polo to degenerate to an open trough by 06:00 UTC on November 5.

== Storm names ==
The following list of names was used for named storms that formed in the North Pacific east of 140°W during 2008. This was the same list used in the 2002 season, except for the name Karina, which replaced Kenna. A storm was named Karina for the first time this year.

- Alma
- Boris
- Cristina
- Douglas
- Elida
- Fausto
- Genevieve
- Hernan
- Iselle
- Julio
- Karina
- Lowell
- Marie
- Norbert
- Odile
- Polo
- Rachel (unused)
- Simon (unused)
- Trudy (unused)
- Vance (unused)
- Winnie (unused)
- Xavier (unused)
- Yolanda (unused)
- Zeke (unused)

For storms that form in the North Pacific between 140°W and the International Date Line, the names come from a series of four rotating lists. Names are used one after the other without regard to year, and when the bottom of one list is reached, the next named storm receives the name at the top of the next list. One named storm, listed below, formed within the area in 2008.

- Kika

=== Retirement ===
In April 2009, at the 31st Session of the RA IV Hurricane Committee, the World Meteorological Organization retired the name Alma from its rotating name lists on account of the damage it caused in Central America. It was replaced with Amanda for the 2014 season.

== Season effects ==
This is a table of all of the storms that formed in the 2008 Pacific hurricane season. It includes their name, duration, peak classification and intensities, areas affected, damage, and death totals. Deaths in parentheses are additional and indirect (an example of an indirect death would be a traffic accident), but were still related to that storm. Damage and deaths include totals while the storm was extratropical, a wave, or a low, and all of the damage figures are in 2008 USD.

Saffir–Simpson scale
TD	TS	C1	C2	C3	C4	C5

2008 Pacific hurricane season statistics
Storm name	Dates active	Storm category at peak intensity	Max 1-min wind mph (km/h)	Min. press. (mbar)	Areas affected	Damage (US$)	Deaths	Ref(s).
Alma	May 29 – 30	Tropical storm	65 (100)	994	Central America	$35 million	4 (7)	
Boris	June 27 – July 4	Category 1 hurricane	80 (130)	985	None	None	None	
Cristina	June 27–30	Tropical storm	50 (85)	999	None	None	None	
Douglas	July 1–4	Tropical storm	40 (65)	1003	Northwestern Mexico, Baja California Peninsula	None	None	
Five-E	July 5–7	Tropical depression	35 (55)	1005	Southwestern Mexico, Western Mexico	$2.2 million	1 (1)	
Elida	July 11–19	Category 2 hurricane	105 (165)	970	Southwestern Mexico, Hawaii	None	None	
Fausto	July 15–22	Category 1 hurricane	90 (150)	977	Clarion Island, Socorro Island	Minimal	None	
Genevieve	July 21–27	Category 1 hurricane	75 (120)	987	Hawaii	None	None	
Hernan	August 6–12	Category 3 hurricane	120 (195)	955	Hawaii	None	None	
Kika	August 7–16	Tropical storm	40 (65)	1007	None (before crossover)	None	None	
Iselle	August 13–16	Tropical storm	50 (85)	999	None	None	None	
Julio	August 23–26	Tropical storm	50 (85)	998	Northwestern Mexico, Baja California Sur, Sinaloa and Arizona	$1 million	2	
Karina	September 2–3	Tropical storm	40 (65)	1000	Socorro Island	None	None	
Lowell	September 6–11	Tropical storm	50 (85)	998	Northwestern Mexico, Baja California Peninsula, Southwestern United States	$15.5 million	6	
Marie	October 1–6	Category 1 hurricane	80 (130)	984	None	None	None	
Norbert	October 4–12	Category 4 hurricane	130 (215)	945	Northwestern Mexico, Baja California Sur, Sonora, Sinaloa	$98.5 million	25	
Odile	October 8–12	Tropical storm	60 (95)	997	Central America, Nicaragua, Honduras, El Salvador, Guatemala, Southwestern Mexico	Minimal	None	
Seventeen-E	October 23–24	Tropical depression	35 (55)	1008	None	None	None	
Polo	November 2–5	Tropical storm	45 (75)	1002	None	None	None	
Season aggregates
19 systems	May 29 – November 5		130 (215)	945		$153 million	38 (8)	

== See also ==
- List of Pacific hurricanes
- Pacific hurricane season
- Tropical cyclones in 2008
- 2008 Atlantic hurricane season
- 2008 Pacific typhoon season
- 2008 North Indian Ocean cyclone season
- South-West Indian Ocean cyclone seasons: 2007–08, 2008–09
- Australian region cyclone seasons: 2007–08, 2008–09
- South Pacific cyclone seasons: 2007–08, 2008–09
