= Hurricane Kyle (2008) =

Category 1 Atlantic hurricane in 2008

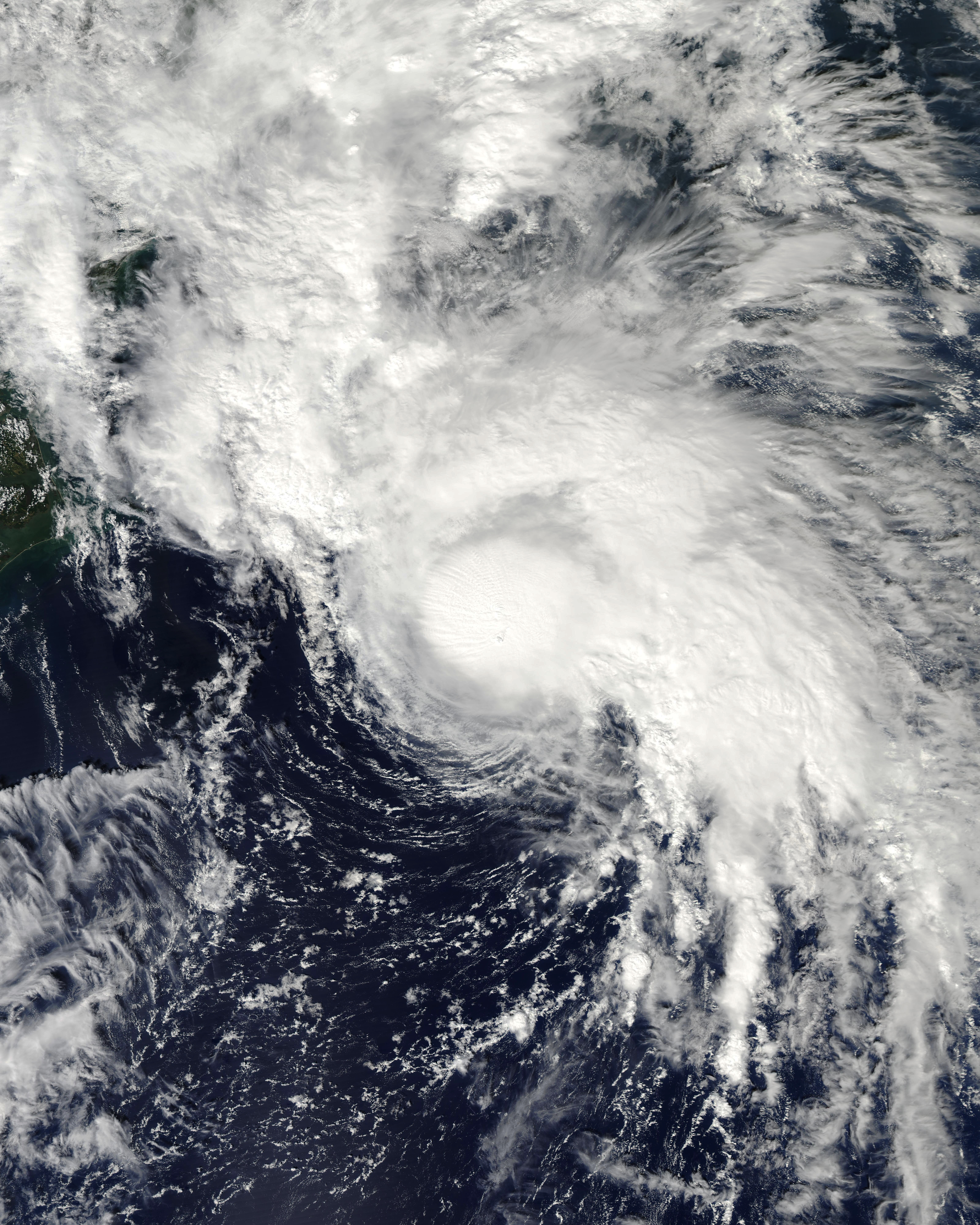
- Hurricane Kyle near peak intensity on September 27

Meteorological history
- Formed: September 25, 2008
- Extratropical: September 29, 2008
- Dissipated: September 30, 2008

Category 1 hurricane
- 1-minute sustained (SSHWS/NWS)
- Highest winds: 85 mph (140 km/h)
- Lowest pressure: 984 mbar (hPa); 29.06 inHg

Overall effects
- Fatalities: 8 total
- Damage: $57.1 million (2008 USD)
- Areas affected: Puerto Rico, Hispaniola, Bermuda, New England, Atlantic Canada, southeastern Quebec
- IBTrACS
- Part of the 2008 Atlantic hurricane season

Hurricane Kyle was a Category 1 hurricane that caused heavy rain and flooding in Puerto Rico in its formative stage and brought hurricane-force winds to Nova Scotia while extratropical. The eleventh tropical storm and sixth hurricane of the 2008 Atlantic hurricane season, Kyle formed from a strong tropical disturbance that tracked across the northeastern Caribbean Sea in the third week of September. As a low pressure area, it moved slowly across Puerto Rico and Hispaniola, dumping torrential rains across those islands.

By September 24, it began to track northward away from the islands, and developed enough strong thunderstorm activity near its center and a well-defined enough circulation to be deemed a tropical storm on September 25. It strengthened to a hurricane on September 27 west of Bermuda. It made landfall in Nova Scotia as a Category 1 hurricane late on September 28, then became extratropical shortly afterward.

The precursor to Kyle produced torrential rainfall over Puerto Rico, resulting in six fatalities and $48 million in damages. Little impact was recorded in Hispaniola and Bermuda as the system tracked northward. Along the eastern United States, rough seas resulted in two fatalities and as the storm made landfall in Canada, heavy rains fell in eastern Maine. In Canada, Kyle had relatively little impact, leaving $9 million in damages and no fatalities.

== Meteorological history ==
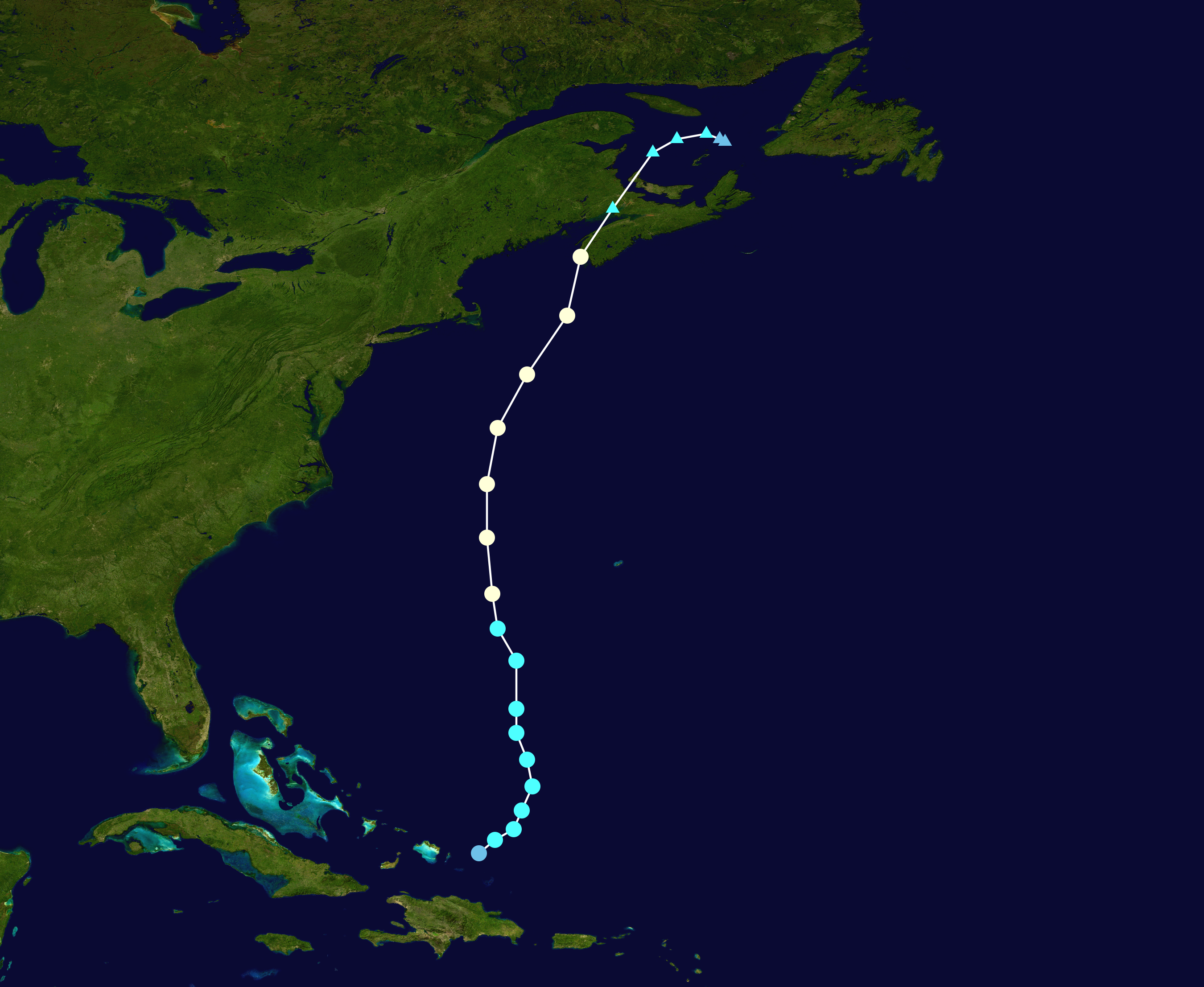
Map plotting the storm's track and intensity, according to the Saffir–Simpson scale Map key Saffir–Simpson scale Tropical depression (≤38 mph, ≤62 km/h) Tropical storm (39–73 mph, 63–118 km/h) Category 1 (74–95 mph, 119–153 km/h) Category 2 (96–110 mph, 154–177 km/h) Category 3 (111–129 mph, 178–208 km/h) Category 4 (130–156 mph, 209–251 km/h) Category 5 (≥157 mph, ≥252 km/h) Unknown Storm type Tropical cyclone Subtropical cyclone Extratropical cyclone, remnant low, tropical disturbance, or monsoon depression

Hurricane Kyle began as a weak area of low pressure associated with a tropical wave that moved off the west coast of Africa on September 12. The system tracked in a general westward direction with little convective development and tracked over the Leeward Islands on September 18. An upper-level trough situated over the eastern Caribbean Sea interacted with the wave, resulting in an increase in shower and thunderstorm activity. The following day, a larger surface circulation developed as the low moved towards the northwest. The wave later became separated from the low, with the wave continuing towards the west and the low tracking to the northwest. The National Hurricane Center (NHC), at this time, were not anticipating significant development of the low as strong wind shear inhibited deep convection from forming. Around 1400 UTC on September 21, a Tropical Cyclone Formation Alert (TCFA) was issued for the system as convection developed around the center of circulation.

Around 0000 UTC on September 25, the disturbance was sufficiently organized to be declared a tropical depression. Shortly after, the NHC issued their first advisory on the system as it intensified into a tropical storm, assigning it the name Kyle. The center of the storm was slightly elongated but moderate wind shear continued to impact the circulation. Kyle track northward in response to an area of high pressure east of Bermuda and an area of low pressure along the eastern United States. The sheared structure of the storm led to problems with recording the intensity of the storm throughout the day. Hurricane Hunters continuously flew into the storm to record information; however, their estimates were considered too high as the storm was disorganized.

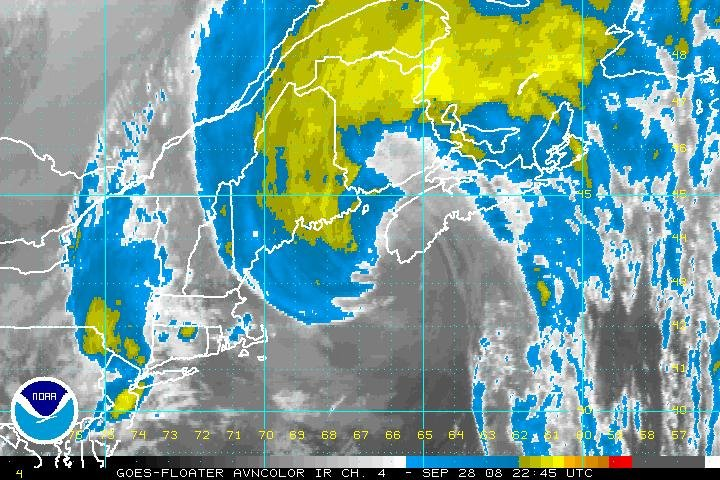
Hurricane Kyle upon landfall in Nova Scotia late on September 28

Late on September 26, shear began to relax and deep convection redeveloped around the center of circulation and the forward motion of the storm began to increase. Several hours later, the storm made a sudden northwest jump due to a passing shortwave trough. By this time, Kyle was just below hurricane-status, with sustained winds up to 70 mph (110 km/h). Continued organization led to the storm attaining hurricane intensity at 1200 UTC on September 27 while located about 345 mi (555 km) west of Bermuda. Upon attaining this intensity, the storm became embedded within an area strong, divergent, upper-level winds. Increasing in forward motion, the center of Kyle was located along the southwestern edge of the deep convection.

By September 28, the storm began to struggle maintaining its intensity due to increasing shear and cooling sea surface temperatures; around 1200 UTC that day, the NHC assessed Kyle to have reached its peak intensity with winds of 85 mph (140 mph). Several hours later, the barometric pressure of the storm decreased to 984 mbar (hPa; 29.06 inHg), the lowest during its existence. Around this time, the hurricane began to undergo an extratropical transition as it approached Nova Scotia. By the end of September 28, little deep convection remained around the center of Kyle. Buoys nearby the storm recorded seas in excess of 36 ft (11 m) and hurricane-force winds as it neared landfall. It was estimated that Kyle made landfall near Yarmouth, Nova Scotia around 0000 UTC on September 29 with winds of 75 mph (120 km/h). This marked the first time since Hurricane Juan in 2003 that a hurricane made landfall in Canada, exactly five years, to the day, prior. Shortly after landfall, the storm weakened below hurricane-status and completed its transition into an extratropical cyclone. Throughout September 29, the remnants slowed and the system attained frontal features. The following day the system moved over the Gulf of Saint Lawrence before being absorbed by another large extratropical cyclone.

== Preparations ==
=== Puerto Rico and Hispaniola ===
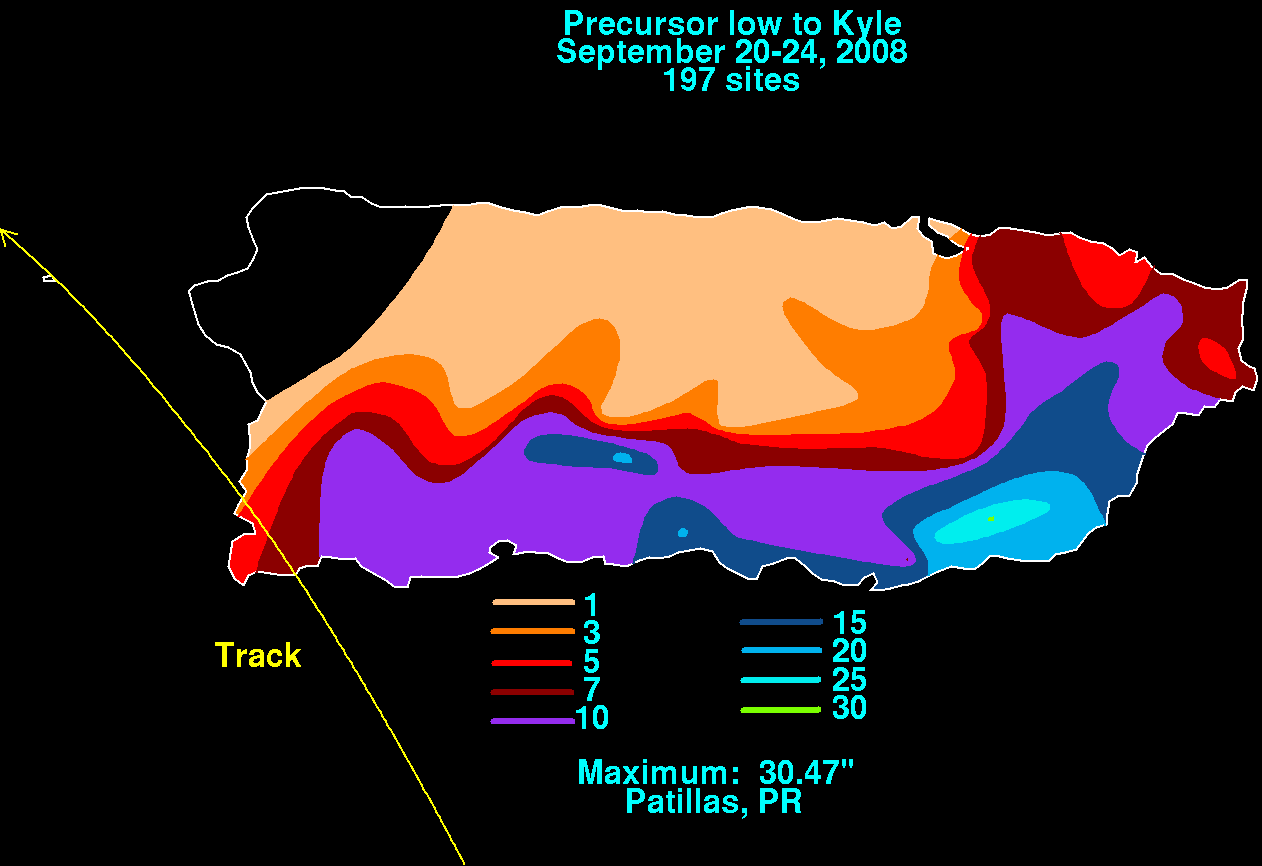
Storm total rainfall from the pre-Kyle low over Puerto Rico

On September 22, about 3 days before the system had formed into a tropical storm, its significant rainfall in the eastern Caribbean prompted flash flood warnings in Puerto Rico and the British Virgin Islands. In the Dominican Republic a green alert was issued for provinces in the eastern part of the nation. The next day yellow alerts were issued for eight provinces and red alerts in eight more. Evacuations began in vulnerable San Pedro de Macoris, La Romana, and Barahona and San Jose de Ocoa. The system moved westward on September 23, threatening Haiti with its rains which prompted the issuance of heavy rain warnings and a red alert warning by the nation's government.

=== Bermuda ===
Early on September 26, Tropical Storm Kyle was deemed to be a threat to Bermuda and a tropical storm watch was issued for the islands. Later that day the watch was upgraded to a tropical storm warning as the storm neared the island. The following day, the warning was discontinued as Hurricane Kyle bypassed the island.

=== New England and Atlantic Canada ===
On September 27, the state of Maine issued its first hurricane watch since 1991. Eastern Maine's power company, Bangor Hydro-Electric, prepared for potential outages and planned to have additional crews on duty. The system turned and missed the state, though.

The Canadian Hurricane Centre issued watches and warnings for parts of Nova Scotia and New Brunswick on September 27, concurrent with the Maine warnings. New Brunswick Power indicated that repair crews were on standby and neighbouring utilities have been called to assist if needed. The Red Cross in New Brunswick also were checking equipment and supplies to meet any need that might arise. Hours before landfall, a hurricane warning was issued for portions of Nova Scotia. This was the first hurricane warning ever in Canada (tropical storm and hurricane advisories were not issued in Canada prior to 2004, a policy changed due to Hurricane Juan in 2003).

== Impact ==
=== Puerto Rico ===
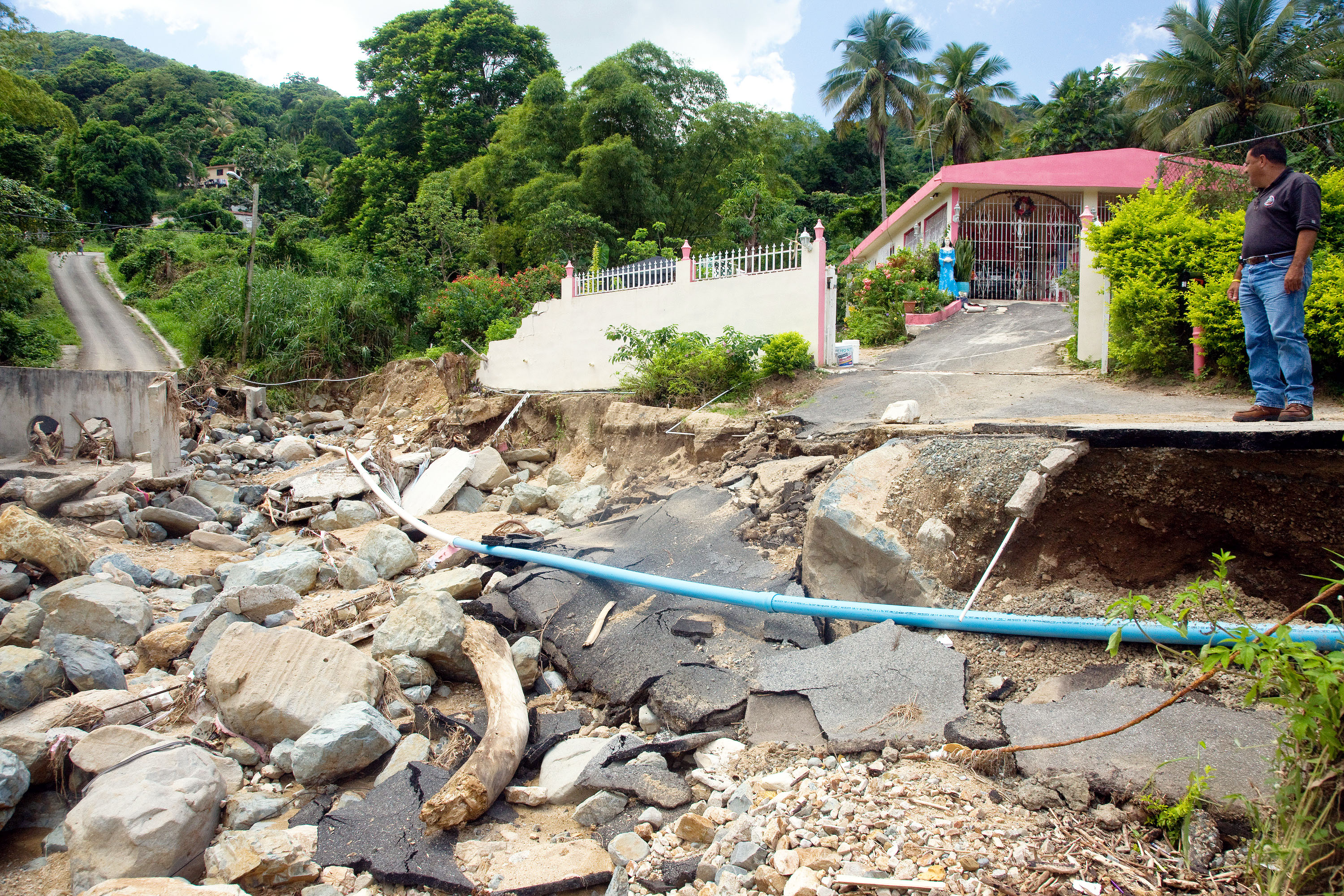
Road damage in the Palo Seco area

The precursor to Kyle produced record breaking rains over Puerto Rico from September 21 to 23. With isolated maxima in excess of 30 inches (760 mm), rivers breached their flood walls and flooded low-lying areas. In Patillas, a 500-year 24‑hour rainfall event took place, with 22.03 in (559.5 mm) falling from 8 a.m. on September 21 to 8 a.m. on September 22. Some rivers rose more than 25 ft (7.6 m) in 12 hours, leading to severe flooding. Three deaths were directly blamed on the system as a result of the floods and mudslides. Another three deaths were indirectly related due to stress induced heart attacks. Mudslides, triggered by the torrential rain, closed highways and schools. Damage to agriculture on the island was estimated to be $23 million and structural damage was estimated at $25 million, for a total of $48 million. In addition to the system's rainfall, its winds whipped up 10 ft (3 m) waves along the island's southern coast.

=== Hispaniola ===
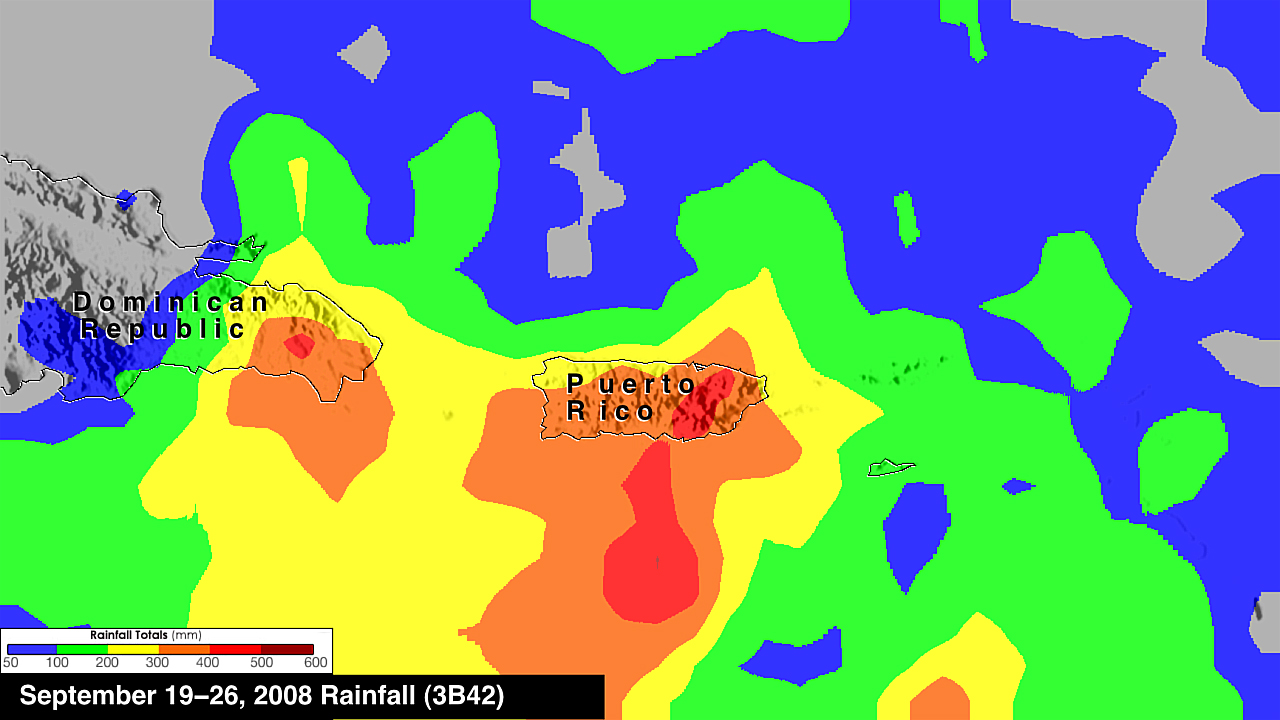
Satellite estimated rainfall totals from the precursor to Kyle between September 19 and 26

Heavy rains on September 23, produced by the tropical wave which would eventually become Kyle, caused renewed flooding in the already flood-stricken areas of the Dominican Republic and Haiti. The Orangers River overflowed its banks, flooding parts of Jacmel, severely damaging homes. By September 26, flash flooding impacted areas recovering from previous floods in the Dominican Republic. Rainfall totals in eastern parts of the Dominican Republic exceeded 16 in (410 mm).

=== Bermuda ===
Between September 25 and 26, the outer bands of Kyle brought sustained winds up to 45 mph (75 km/h) and heavy rains that amounted to 1.53 in (39 mm) during the two-day span in Bermuda. The heaviest rainfall fell mostly on the western coast of the island as a narrow band of moderate rainfall tracked through. No structural damage or injuries resulted from the passage of Kyle in Bermuda.

=== Northeast United States ===
Kyle produced high waves along the coast of Rhode Island as it moved northward. A newly married couple were killed when high waves knocked the wife into the rocky shores. Her husband jumped in to save her but was overcome by the waves himself. The bodies of the couple were found days later. Large swells produced by Kyle, enhanced by a strong onshore flow, caused significant beach erosion along the New Jersey coastline. Cuts up to 6 ft (1.8 m) in beach dunes were recorded. Heavy rains from Kyle caused flash flooding in Hartford County, Connecticut, flooding six cars and numerous basements. Total damages in Hartford were estimated at $40,000.

Rainfall up to 5 in (127 mm) in Massachusetts caused a river in Somerset to overflow its banks, flooding nearby areas with 2 feet (0.6 m) of water. A large sinkhole formed on County Street and several cars were stranded in the floodwaters. Two people had to be rescued by boat when their car was overcome by the floodwaters. In addition, numerous basements were flooded. Damages in Bristol County were estimated at $25,000. A mobile home park in Plymouth County was inundated with 2.5 ft (0.7 m) of water, causing one home to shift off its foundation. Damages to the homes were estimated at $50,000.

As the storm made landfall in Nova Scotia, the outer bands produced heavy rains and strong winds over eastern Maine. Wind gusts were recorded up to 45 mph (75 km/h) in coastal Hancock County. The strong winds toppled trees, leaving 500 customers without power. Rainfall generally amounted from 3 to 4.5 in (76.2 to 114.3 mm), with a maximum of 7.15 in (181.61 mm) in Sedgwick Ridge. The heavy rains flooded several roads, causing traffic delays and road closures throughout southeastern Maine. Throughout the Northeast United States, two people were killed and damages were estimated at $115,000.

=== Canada ===
The extratropical remnants of Hurricane Kyle on September 29

Upon making landfall, Kyle produced a 2.6 ft (0.79 m) storm surge in combination with high tide and a new moon. In southwestern Nova Scotia, high winds downed numerous trees and power lines. A ship reported a wind gust of 96 mph (154 km/h) near Shelburne and a boat was reported to have been swamped nearby. The highest rainfall was recorded in Bon Accord, New Brunswick at 2.8 in (72 mm). Light rainfall, up to 1.6 in (41 mm) fell over Prince Edward Island and Nova Scotia. A buoy in Georges Bank recorded a wind gust of 79 mph (128 km/h). According to Nova Scotia Power Corporation at the height of the storm, winds knocked out power to more than 40,000 customers. While in New Brunswick, strong winds and heavy rainfall were strong enough to knock power out for approximately 2,300 customers across the province. Gusting winds resulted in the Confederation Bridge, linking New Brunswick and Prince Edward Island, being closed to high-sided vehicles for 7½ hours. No fatalities were reported in Canada, and damages were minor, totaling to $9 million.

== Aftermath ==
On October 1, President George W. Bush declared Puerto Rico major disaster area. The declaration allowed federal assistance to reach affected communities in the United States Commonwealth. Residents who met the requirements to receive federal aid were eligible for funding for temporary housing. People who lost their jobs due to the flooding were eligible for unemployment grants for 26 weeks starting the day of the disaster declaration. Residents were able to receive up to $200,000 for home damages; up to $40,000 in personal possession losses; and up to $2 million for business losses. By October 17, more than $5.6 million in disaster aid was approved for 20,284 residences. Community Relations teams visited about 7,000 people. Out of the 4,140 small-business loans applications, only 288 were submitted by this time. By October 25, the amount of funds nearly doubled, reaching $11 million. At this time, more than, 24,500 residents applied for disaster loans. Survey teams checked over 18,000 homes for flood-related damages at this time also. Funding reached $16.5 million by November 7, with 29,000 people requesting federal assistance. By December 5, funding for 37,000 residents reached $23.1 million. At this time, the deadline for federal assistance requests was set for January 15, 2009. On January 2, 2009, funding for small businesses was being provided, with $6 million being contributed. Grants for residents also reached $25 million. After the flooded rivers crested and receded, bulldozers began clearing mud covered streets.

== See also ==
- List of Canada hurricanes
- 2008 Atlantic hurricane season
- Timeline of the 2008 Atlantic hurricane season
