= Tropical Storm Marco (2008) =

Atlantic tropical storm in 2008

- Tropical Storm Marco near peak intensity, just north of Mexico on October 6

Meteorological history
- Formed: October 6, 2008
- Dissipated: October 7, 2008

Tropical storm
- 1-minute sustained (SSHWS/NWS)
- Highest winds: 65 mph (100 km/h)
- Lowest pressure: 998 mbar (hPa); 29.47 inHg

Overall effects
- Fatalities: None reported
- Damage: Minimal
- Areas affected: Mexico
- IBTrACS
- Part of the 2008 Atlantic hurricane season

Tropical Storm Marco was the smallest tropical cyclone on record by radius of winds from its center. The thirteenth named storm of the 2008 Atlantic hurricane season, Marco developed out of a broad area of low pressure over the northwestern Caribbean during late September 2008. Influenced by a tropical wave on October 4, a small low-level circulation center developed over Belize. After crossing the southern end of the Yucatán Peninsula and emerging into the Bay of Campeche, the low was declared Tropical Depression Thirteen early on October 6. The depression quickly intensified into a tropical storm and was given the name Marco later that day. Marco reached its peak intensity with winds of 65 mph (100 km/h) early on October 7. Around this time, tropical storm force winds extended 11.5 miles (18.5 km) from the center of the storm, making Marco the smallest tropical cyclone on record. Around 12:00 UTC, Marco made landfall near Misantla, Veracruz. The storm rapidly weakened after landfall, dissipating later that day.

Due to its small size, Marco caused minimal damage; however, the storm's heavy rains led to floods up to 10 feet (3.05 m) deep that covered highways and damaged homes.

== Meteorological history ==
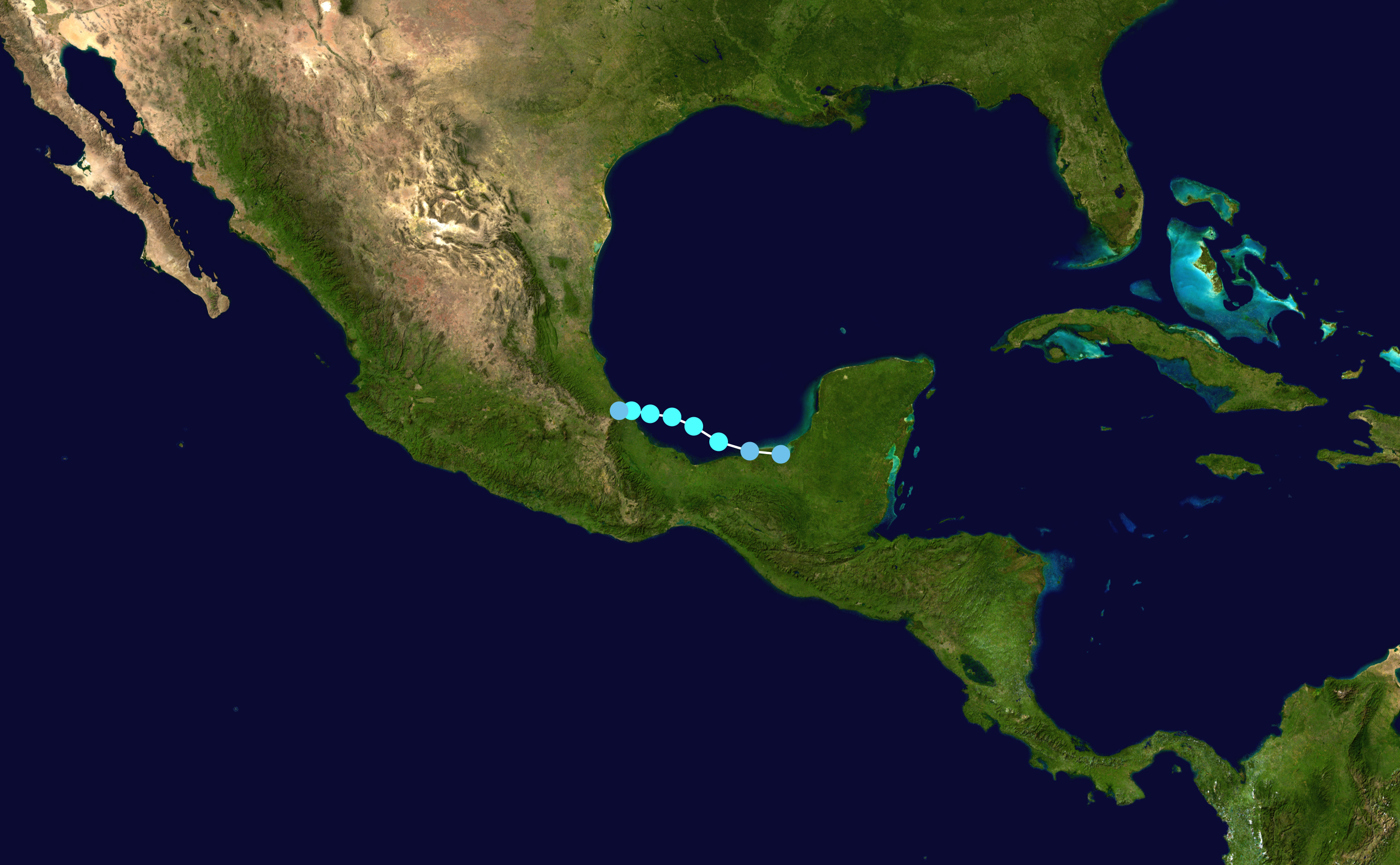
Map plotting the storm's track and intensity, according to the Saffir–Simpson scale Map key Saffir–Simpson scale Tropical depression (≤38 mph, ≤62 km/h) Tropical storm (39–73 mph, 63–118 km/h) Category 1 (74–95 mph, 119–153 km/h) Category 2 (96–110 mph, 154–177 km/h) Category 3 (111–129 mph, 178–208 km/h) Category 4 (130–156 mph, 209–251 km/h) Category 5 (≥157 mph, ≥252 km/h) Unknown Storm type Tropical cyclone Subtropical cyclone Extratropical cyclone, remnant low, tropical disturbance, or monsoon depression

Tropical Storm Marco originated in a broad area of low pressure that persisted over the northwestern Caribbean in early October, 2008. On October 4, a tropical wave reached the same area, and the system spawned a circulation center over Belize. Development of the low was initially inhibited by its proximity to land. As the system neared the Bay of Campeche, convection quickly developed around the low. At 00:00 UTC on October 6, the low was designated as Tropical Depression Thirteen while located over Laguna de Términos. A mid-level ridge located to the north of the depression led to movement in a general west-northwest direction. Forecasters anticipated intensification up until landfall because of the storm's well-developed outflow and the low wind shear and high sea surface temperatures in its path. By 12:00 UTC, the small cyclone, with a cloud shield no more than 85 miles (137 kilometers) across, was upgraded to Tropical Storm Marco.

Favorable conditions for development allowed Marco to quickly intensify throughout the day on October 6. Early on October 7, Marco reached its peak intensity with winds of 66 mph (106 km/h) and a minimum pressure of 998 millibar (hPa; 29.47 inHg). This was based on a reconnaissance mission into Marco which recorded flight-level winds of 70 mph (110 km/h), corresponding to a surface wind speed of 61 mph (98 km/h). Following the quick increase in intensity, forecasters noted the possibility of Marco intensifying into a hurricane before making landfall. The storm maintained a small area of deep convection, averaging 9.2 miles (14.8 km) in diameter, as it continued moving towards the west-northwest. Shortly after reaching peak intensity, tropical storm force winds extended 11.5 miles (18.5 km) from the center of Marco. At 12:00 UTC, the center of Marco made landfall near Misantla, Veracruz, with winds of 65 mph (105 km/h). Once inland, Marco rapidly weakened, being downgraded to a tropical depression six hours after landfall. The small depression dissipated later that day over the mountains of Mexico.

== Preparations, impact, and records ==
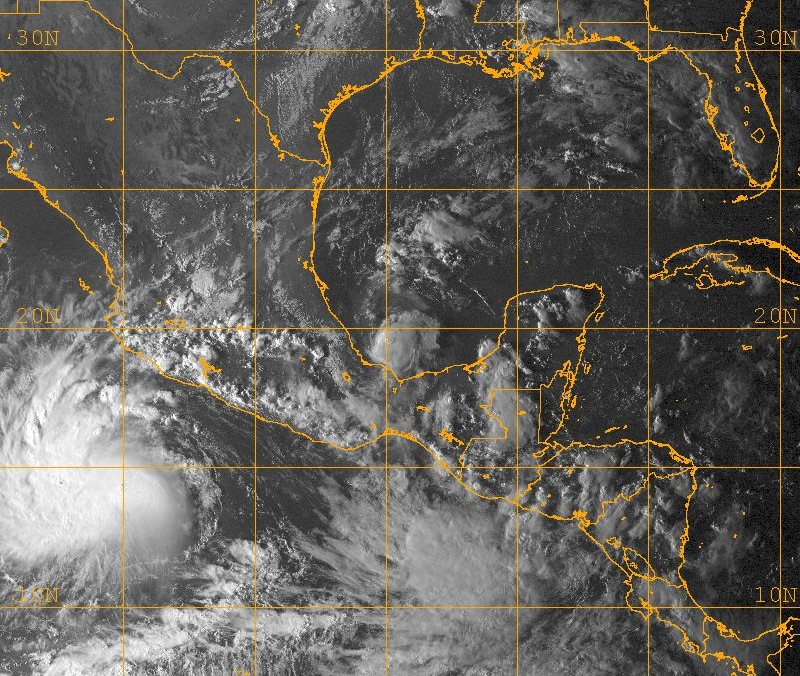
Tropical Storms Marco (center), Norbert (bottom left), and the low that would eventually become Odile (bottom) on October 6.

Upon the storm's formation, the Government of Mexico issued a tropical storm warning for the Gulf of Mexico from Tuxpan to Punta El Lagarto. That afternoon the government issued a hurricane watch between Cabo Rojo and Veracruz, and extended the tropical storm warning northward to Cabo Rojo. Officials closed schools ahead of the storm and opened 200 shelters. An estimated 3,000 people were evacuated from low-lying areas along the coast. Soldiers used school buses to transport evacuees to the shelters. Marco formed in the area of Mexico's main oil-facilities, leading to the evacuation of 33 workers from four platforms. Six oil wells and a natural gas processing plant were also shut down in Veracruz. The Mexican Secretariat of Communications and Transportation also closed the ports of Nautla and Alvarado to small vessels as a precautionary measure.

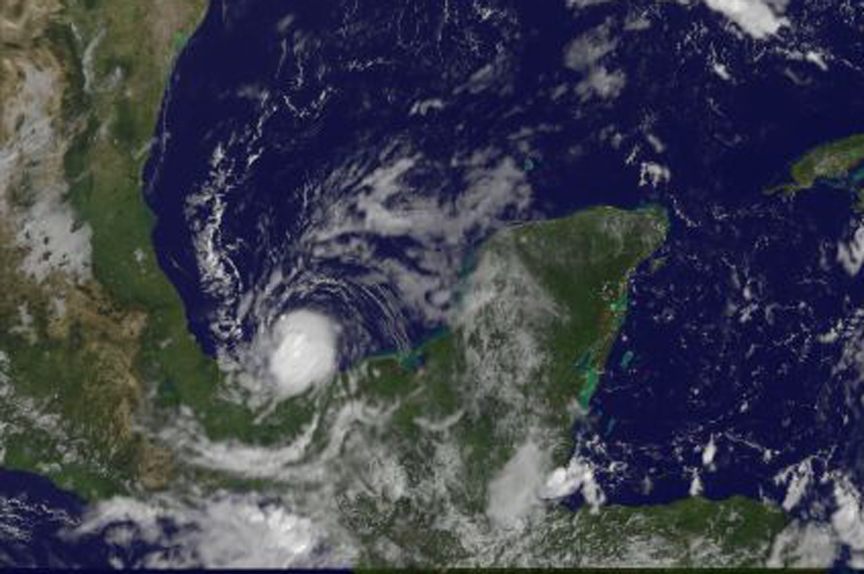
Marco shortly after being upgraded to a tropical storm on October 6

Upon landfall, heavy rains peaking at 7.9 inches (201 millimeters) in El Pujal, San Luis Potosí and falling at rates up to 1 inch per hour (25.4 mm/h), caused some flooding in coastal towns near Veracruz as people evacuated to higher ground. The rains from Marco worsened flood situations in areas of Mexico already suffering from severe flooding. Officials in Veracruz, in their post-storm damage survey, reported that two rivers, the Quilate and Tenoch, overflowed their banks due to rains produced by Marco. One of these rivers left the towns of Minatitlan and Hidalgotitlan under 10 ft (3 m) of water. Highways along the coast of Veracruz were also flooded. Another 250 homes were flooded when a lake and a river overflowed their banks. Thirteen municipalities within Veracruz were affected by Marco. In Vega de Alatorre, 77 people were evacuated to nearby shelters after their homes were inundated with water. Three landslides were also reported in Misantla Colipa; none of them caused damage. In all, Marco's impact was light; minimal damage was recorded, and none of the estimated 400,000 people affected by the storm sustained injury.

In the wake of Marco, the General Coordination of Civil Protection of the Ministry of the Interior declared a state of emergency for 48 municipalities in Veracruz. Relief goods were distributed to the affected areas by October 9. The Government of Mexico reported that 4,700 blankets, 2,900 mattresses, 5,555 bottles of water (each containing 500 milliliters), 260,000 boxes of milk, 250,000 packages of biscuits, and 12,400 boxes of school supplies had been distributed.

At 00:52 UTC on October 7, tropical storm force winds extended 11.5 miles (18.5 km) from the center of Marco. This made Marco the smallest tropical cyclone ever recorded, surpassing the previous record set on December 24, 1974 by Cyclone Tracy, whose tropical storm-force winds extended 30 miles (48 km).

== See also ==
- List of tropical cyclone records
- Timeline of the 2008 Atlantic hurricane season
- Hurricane Oscar (2024) – smallest storm of hurricane strength on record
