= Timeline of the 2008 Atlantic hurricane season =

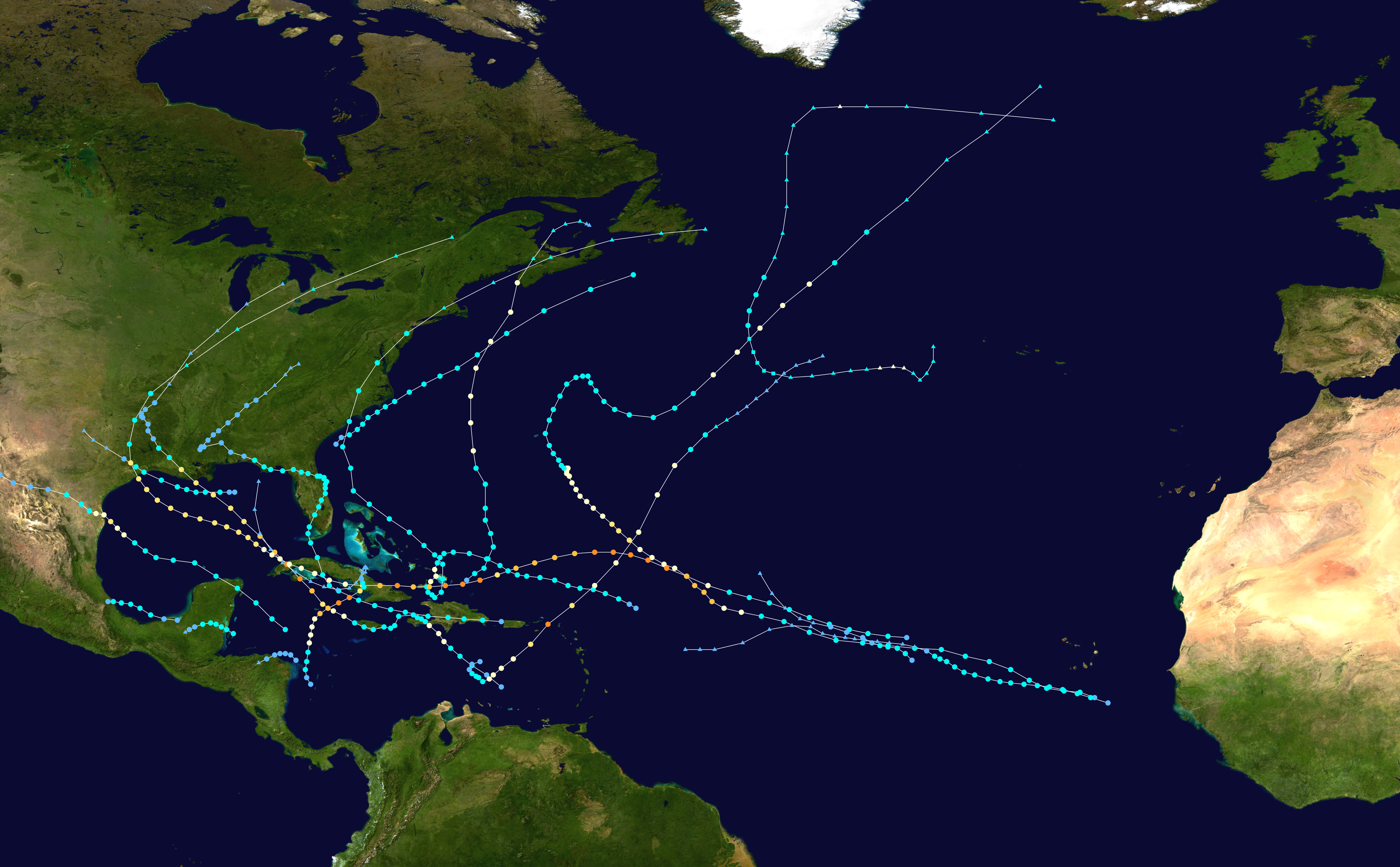
- Season summary map

Season boundaries
- First system formed: May 31, 2008
- Last system dissipated: November 10, 2008

Strongest system
- By maximum sustained winds: Gustav
  - Maximum winds: 155 mph (250 km/h) (1-minute sustained)
  - Lowest pressure: 941 mbar (hPa; 27.79 inHg)
- By central pressure: Ike
  - Maximum winds: 145 mph (230 km/h) (1-minute sustained)
  - Lowest pressure: 935 mbar (hPa; 27.61 inHg)

Longest lasting system
- Name: Bertha
- Duration: 17 days
Storm articles
- Tropical Storm Arthur (2008)
- Hurricane Bertha (2008)
- Tropical Storm Cristobal (2008)
- Hurricane Dolly (2008)
- Tropical Storm Edouard (2008)
- Tropical Storm Fay (2008)
- Hurricane Gustav
- Hurricane Hanna (2008)
- Hurricane Ike
- Hurricane Kyle (2008)
- Tropical Storm Laura (2008)
- Tropical Storm Marco (2008)
- Hurricane Omar
- Hurricane Paloma

The 2008 Atlantic hurricane season was an event in the annual tropical cyclone season in the north Atlantic Ocean. An above-average Atlantic hurricane season, (Note: An average season, as defined by the National Oceanic and Atmospheric Administration, has twelve tropical storms, six hurricanes and two major hurricanes.) it was the first on record to have a major hurricane in every month from July to November.

The season officially began on June 1, 2008, and ended on November 30, 2008, dates that conventionally delimit the period of each year when most tropical cyclones develop in the Atlantic basin. The season's first storm, Tropical Storm Arthur, formed on May 30, and the last, Hurricane Paloma, dissipated on November 10. Pre-season forecasts noted a high possibility for an above average number of tropical cyclones, primarily due to lingering La Niña effects and abnormally warm sea surface temperatures across the Atlantic basin. Altogether, 16 of the 17 tropical cyclones observed during the season developed into tropical storms. Of these, eight became hurricanes with five intensifying further into major hurricanes. (Note: Hurricanes reaching Category 3 (wind speeds of 111 miles per hour (179 km/h)) or higher on the 5-level Saffir–Simpson wind speed scale are considered major hurricanes.) With the exception of Tropical Storm Nana, every tropical cyclone during the season affected land to an extent.

This timeline documents tropical cyclone formations, strengthening, weakening, landfalls, extratropical transitions, and dissipations during the season. It includes information that was not released throughout the season, meaning that data from post-storm reviews by the National Hurricane Center, such as a storm that was not initially warned upon, has been included.

The time stamp for each event is first stated using Coordinated Universal Time (UTC), the 24-hour clock where 00:00 = midnight UTC. The NHC uses both UTC and the time zone where the center of the tropical cyclone is currently located. The time zones utilized (east to west) prior to 2020 were: Atlantic, Eastern, and Central. In this timeline, the respective area time is included in parentheses. Additionally, figures for maximum sustained winds and position estimates are rounded to the nearest 5 units (miles, or kilometers), following National Hurricane Center practice. Direct wind observations are rounded to the nearest whole number. Atmospheric pressures are listed to the nearest millibar and nearest hundredth of an inch of mercury.

== Timeline ==
=== May ===
Tropical Storm Arthur after being classified as a tropical storm on May 31

May 31

- 0000 UTC (8:00 p.m. EDT May 30) – Tropical Storm Arthur develops from an area of low pressure roughly 45 mi (72 km) east of Belize City, Belize.
- 0600 UTC (2:00 a.m. EDT) – Tropical Storm Arthur attains its peak intensity with winds of 45 mph (72 km/h) and a barometric pressure of 1004 mbar (hPa; 29.65 inHg).
- 0900 UTC (5:00 a.m. EDT) – Tropical Storm Arthur makes landfall in northeastern Belize, about midway between Belize City and Chetumal, Mexico, with winds of 45 mph (72 km/h).

=== June ===
June 1

- The 2008 Atlantic hurricane season officially begins.
- 1200 UTC (8:00 a.m. EDT) – Tropical Storm Arthur weakens to a tropical depression over the Yucatan, roughly 15 mi (24 km) north of the northern border of Guatemala and Mexico.

June 2

- 0000 UTC (8:00 p.m. EDT June 1) – Tropical Depression Arthur degenerates into a non-convective remnant low pressure area.

=== July ===
July 3

- 0600 UTC (2:00 a.m. AST) – Tropical Depression Two develops from a tropical wave roughly 220 mi (350 km) south-southeast of the Cape Verde Islands.
- 1200 UTC (8:00 a.m. AST) – Tropical Depression Two strengthens into Tropical Storm Bertha to the south of the Cape Verde Islands.

July 7

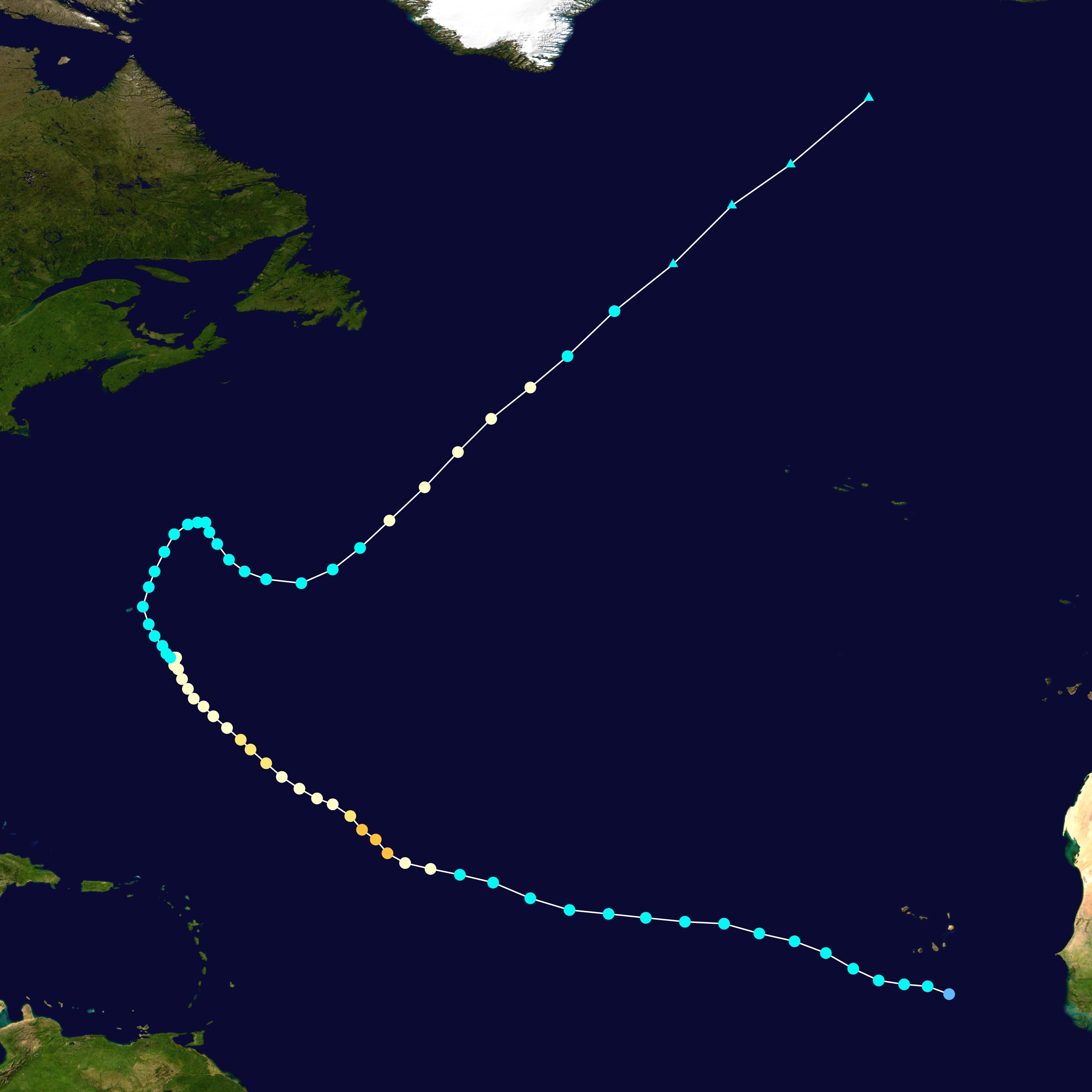
Track map of Hurricane Bertha

- 0600 UTC (2:00 a.m. AST) – Tropical Storm Bertha strengthens into a Category 1 hurricane on the Saffir–Simpson hurricane scale, the first of the season, roughly 750 mi (1,210 km) east of the northern Leeward Islands.
- 1800 UTC (2:00 p.m. AST) – Hurricane Bertha rapidly strengthens into a major hurricane—a storm with winds of 111 mph (179 km/h) or higher.
- 2100 UTC (5:00 p.m. AST) – Hurricane Bertha attains its peak intensity with winds of 125 mph (201 km/h) and a minimum barometric pressure of 951 mbar (28.1 inHg).

July 8

- 1200 UTC (8:00 a.m. AST) – Hurricane Bertha weakens to a Category 2 hurricane.
- 1800 UTC (2:00 p.m. AST) – Hurricane Bertha weakens to a Category 1 hurricane.

July 9

- 1800 UTC (2:00 p.m. AST) – Hurricane Bertha restrengthens into a Category 2 hurricane.

July 10

- 0600 UTC (2:00 a.m. AST) – Hurricane Bertha weakens to a Category 1 hurricane.

July 13

- 1200 UTC (8:00 a.m. AST) – Hurricane Bertha weakens to a tropical storm.

July 18

- 1800 UTC (2:00 p.m. AST) – Tropical Storm Bertha strengthens into a Category 1 hurricane for a second time.

July 19

- 0000 UTC (8:00 p.m. AST July 18) – Tropical Depression Three develops from an area of low pressure roughly 60 mph (97 km/h) east of the Georgia/South Carolina border.
- 1200 UTC (8:00 a.m. AST) – Tropical Depression Three strengthens into Tropical Storm Cristobal off the coast of South Carolina.

July 20

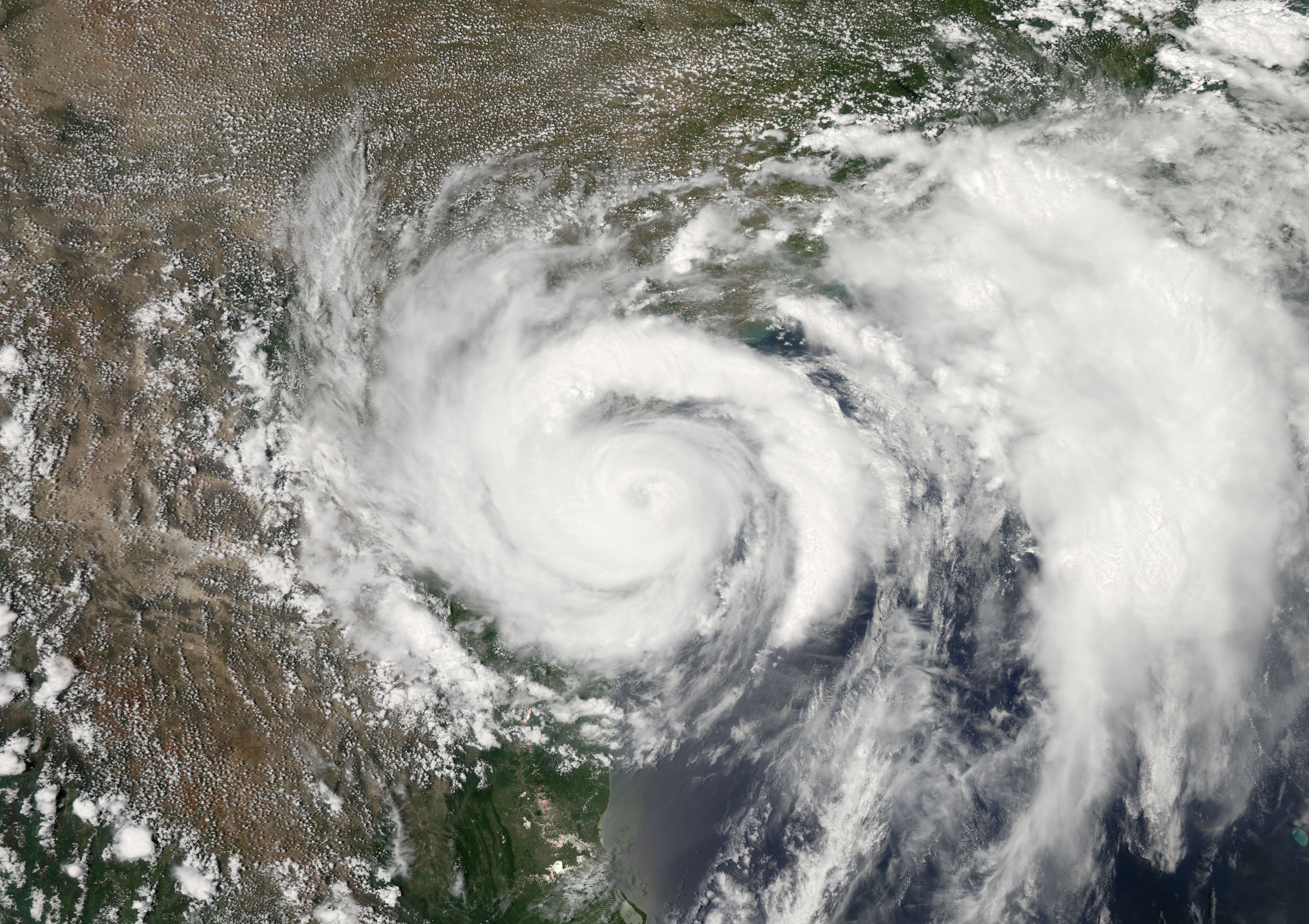
Hurricane Dolly shortly after making landfall on the Texas coastline

- 0000 UTC (8:00 p.m. AST July 19) – Hurricane Bertha weakens into a tropical storm once again.
- 1200 UTC (8:00 a.m. AST) – Tropical Storm Bertha transitions into an extratropical cyclone.
- 1200 UTC (8:00 a.m. AST) – Tropical Storm Dolly develops from a tropical wave 270 mi (430 km) east of Chetumal, Mexico.

July 21

- 0530 UTC (1:30 a.m. AST) – Tropical Storm Dolly makes landfall near Cancun, Mexico with winds of 50 mph (80 km/h).

July 22

- 1200 UTC (8:00 a.m. AST) – Tropical Storm Cristobal reaches its peak intensity with winds of 65 mph (105 km/h) and a minimum barometric pressure of 998 mbar (29.5 inHg).

July 23

- 0000 UTC (7:00 p.m. CDT July 22) – Tropical Storm Dolly intensifies into a Category 1 hurricane.
- 1200 UTC (8:00 a.m. AST) – Tropical Storm Cristobal is absorbed by a larger extratropical cyclone.
- 1400 UTC (9:00 a.m. CDT) – Hurricane Dolly strengthens into a Category 2 hurricane and reaches its peak intensity with winds of 100 mph (160 km/h) and a minimum barometric pressure of 963 mbar (28.4 inHg) off the coast of Texas.
- 1820 UTC (1:20 p.m. CDT) – Hurricane Dolly makes landfall on the Texas mainland, about 15 mi (24 km) southeast of Port Mansfield, Texas, with winds of 85 mph (137 km/h).
- 2000 UTC (3:00 p.m. CDT) – Hurricane Dolly makes landfall on the Texas mainland, roughly 10 mi (16 km) south of Port Mansfield, Texas, with winds of 80 mph (130 km/h).

July 24

- 0600 UTC (1:00 a.m. CDT) – Hurricane Dolly weakens to a tropical storm.

July 25

- 0000 UTC (7:00 p.m. CDT July 24) – Tropical Storm Dolly weakens to a tropical depression over extreme northern Mexico.

July 26

- 0000 UTC (7:00 p.m. CDT July 25) – Tropical Depression Dolly degenerates into a non-convective remnant low pressure area over the mountainous terrain of inland Mexico.

=== August ===
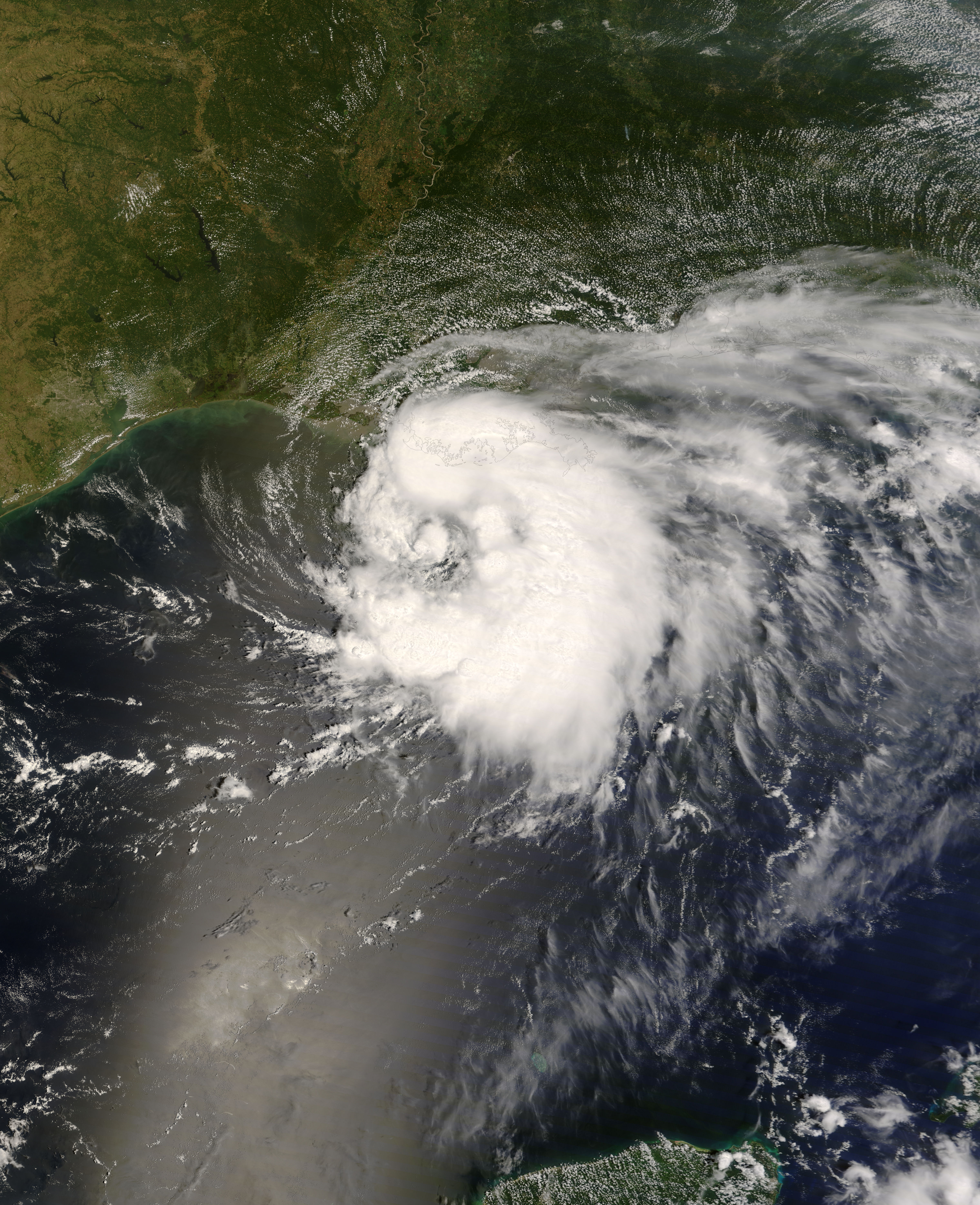
Tropical Storm Edouard off the coast of Louisiana on August 5

August 3

- 1200 UTC (7:00 a.m. CDT) – Tropical Depression Five develops from an area of low pressure roughly 140 mi (230 km) south of Pensacola, Florida.

August 4

- 0000 UTC (7:00 p.m. CDT August 3) – Tropical Depression Five strengthens into Tropical Storm Edouard to the southeast of Louisiana.

August 5

- 1200 UTC (7:00 a.m. CDT) – Tropical Storm Edouard reaches its peak intensity with winds of 65 mph (105 km/h) and a minimum barometric pressure of 996 mbar (29.4 inHg). At this time, Edouard also makes landfall at McFaddin National Wildlife Refuge, Texas.

August 6

- 0000 UTC (7:00 p.m. CDT August 6) – Tropical Storm Edouard weakens to a tropical depression over inland Texas.
- 0600 UTC (1:00 a.m. CDT) – Tropical Depression Edouard degenerates into a non-convective remnant low pressure area over northern Texas.

August 15

- 1200 UTC (8:00 a.m. EDT) – A tropical depression develops just west of the northwestern tip of Puerto Rico.
- 1430 UTC (10:30 a.m. EDT) – The tropical depression near Puerto Rico strengthens into Tropical Storm Fay and makes landfall near El Cabo, Dominican Republic with winds of 40 mph (64 km/h).

August 16

- 1145 UTC (7:45 a.m. EDT) – Tropical Storm Fay makes landfall along eastern Gonavé Island, Haiti with winds of 45 mph (72 km/h).

August 17

- 0900 UTC (5:00 a.m. EDT) – Tropical Storm Fay makes landfall 20 mi (32 km) east of Cabo Cruz, Cuba with winds of 45 mph (72 km/h).

August 18

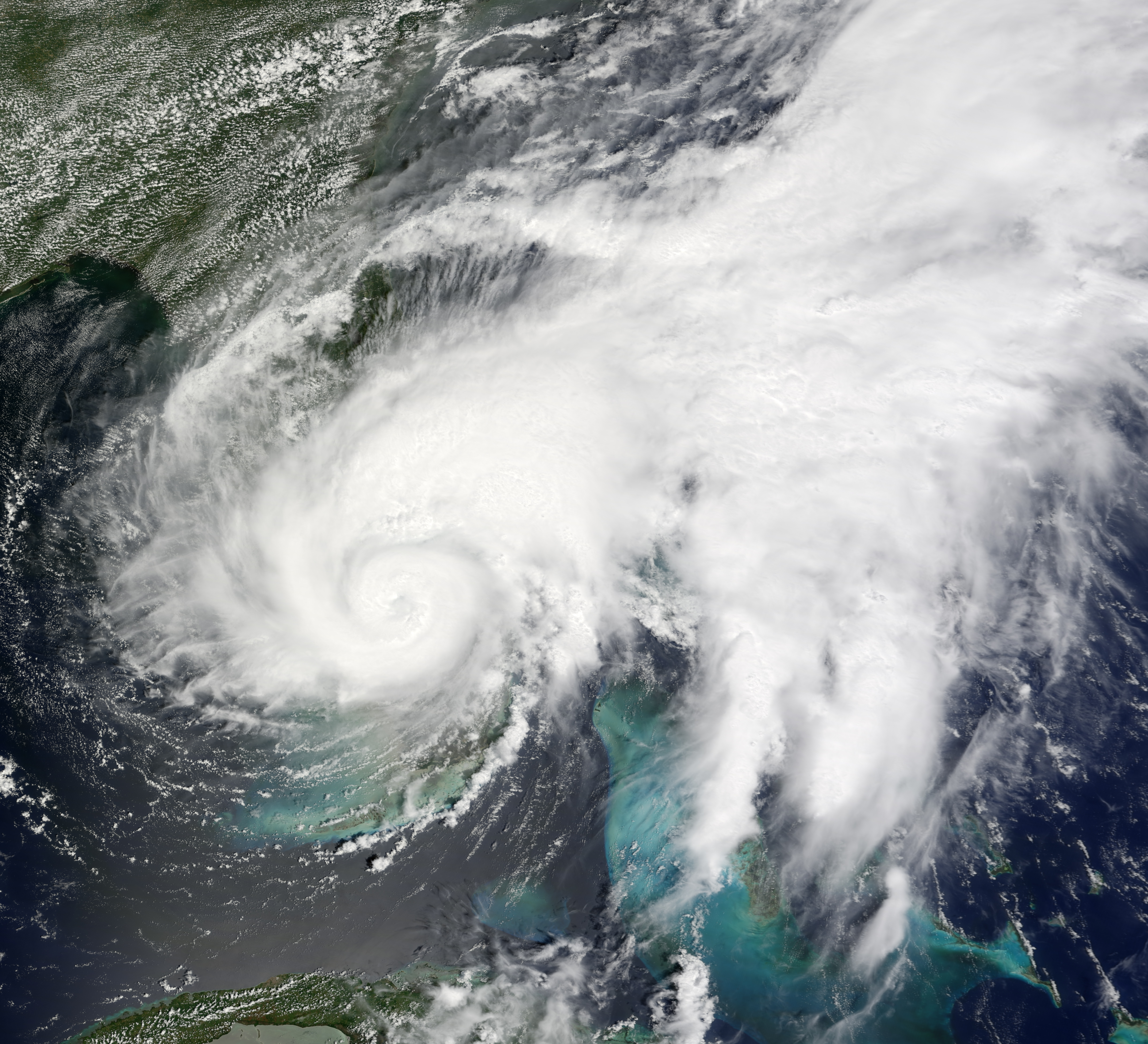
Tropical Storm Fay over Florida on August 19

- 0700 UTC (3:00 a.m. EDT) – Tropical Storm makes landfall 20 mi (32 km) west of Cienfuegos, Cuba with winds of 45 mph (72 km/h).
- 2030 UTC (4:30 p.m. EDT) – Tropical Storm Fay makes its first landfall on Florida, near Key West, with winds of 60 mph (97 km/h).

August 19

- 0845 UTC (4:45 a.m. EDT) – Tropical Storm Fay makes its second landfall on Florida, just east of Cape Romano, with winds of 65 mph (105 km/h).
- 1800 UTC (2:00 p.m. EDT) – Tropical Storm Fay reaches its peak intensity with winds of 70 mph (110 km/h) and a minimum barometric pressure of 986 mbar (29.1 inHg).

August 21

- 1900 UTC (3:00 p.m. EDT) – Tropical Storm Fay makes its third landfall on Florida, near Flagler Beach, with winds of 65 mph (105 km/h).

August 23

- 0615 UTC (2:15 a.m. EDT) – Tropical Storm Fay makes a record-breaking fourth landfall on Florida, just southwest of Carrabelle, with winds of 50 mph (80 km/h).

August 24

- 0000 UTC (8:00 p.m. EDT August 23) – Tropical Storm Fay weakens to a tropical depression.

August 25

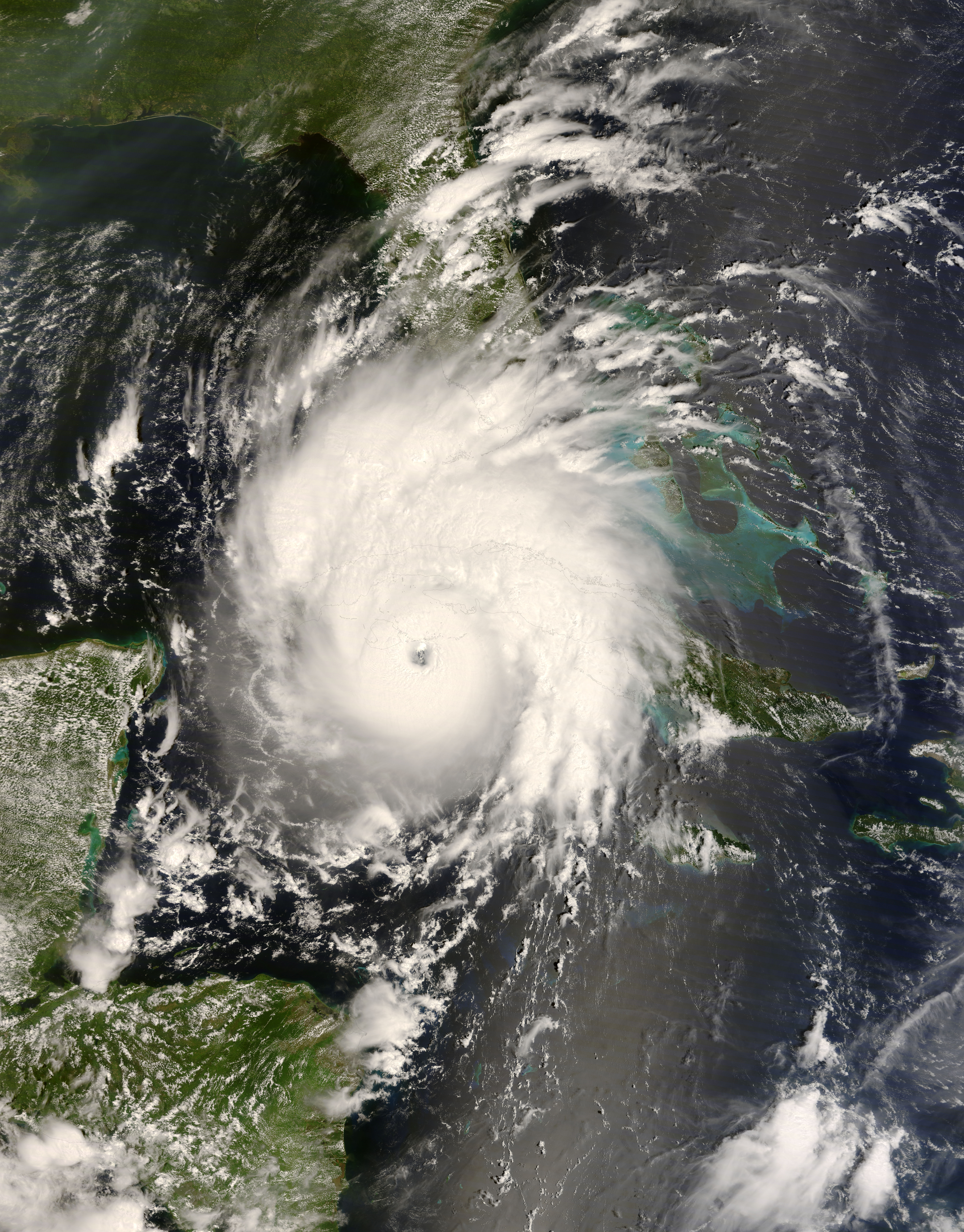
Hurricane Gustav near peak intensity

- 0000 UTC (8:00 p.m. EDT August 24) – Tropical Depression Seven forms from a tropical wave roughly 95 mi (153 km) northeast of Bonaire.
- 1200 UTC (8:00 a.m. EDT) – Tropical Depression Seven rapidly intensifies into Tropical Storm Gustav.

August 26

- 0600 UTC (2:00 a.m. EDT) – Tropical Storm Gustav strengthens into a Category 1 hurricane.
- 1800 UTC (2:00 p.m. EDT) – Hurricane Gustav makes landfall on the southwestern peninsula of Haiti with winds of 80 mph (130 km/h)
- 0000 UTC (8:00 p.m. EDT August 26) – Hurricane Gustav weakens to a tropical storm over the southwestern peninsula of Haiti.
- 0600 UTC (2:00 a.m. EDT) – Tropical Storm Fay merges with a larger extratropical cyclone.

August 28

- 0000 UTC (8:00 p.m. EDT August 27) – Tropical Depression Eight forms from an area of low pressure roughly 275 mi (443 km) east-northwest of the northern Leeward Islands.
- 1200 UTC (8:00 a.m. EDT) – Tropical Depression Eight strengthens into Tropical Storm Hanna.
- 1800 UTC (2:00 p.m. EDT) – Tropical Storm Gustav makes landfall near Manchioneal, Jamaica with winds of 70 mph (110 km/h).

August 29

- 0200 UTC (10:00 p.m. EDT August 28) – Tropical Storm Gustav makes landfall just east of Lionel Town, Jamaica with winds of 70 mph (110 km/h).
- 1800 UTC (2:00 p.m. EDT) – Tropical Storm Gustav restrengthens into a hurricane.

August 30

- 1800 UTC (2:00 p.m. EDT) – Hurricane Gustav makes landfall on the southeastern coast of the Isle of Youth, Cuba with winds of 145 mph (233 km/h).
- 2200 UTC (6:00 p.m. EDT) – Hurricane Gustav reaches its peak intensity with winds of 155 mph (249 km/h) and a minimum barometric pressure of 941 mbar (27.8 inHg). Additionally, Gustav makes landfall just east of Los Palacios, Cuba at this intensity.

=== September ===
September 1

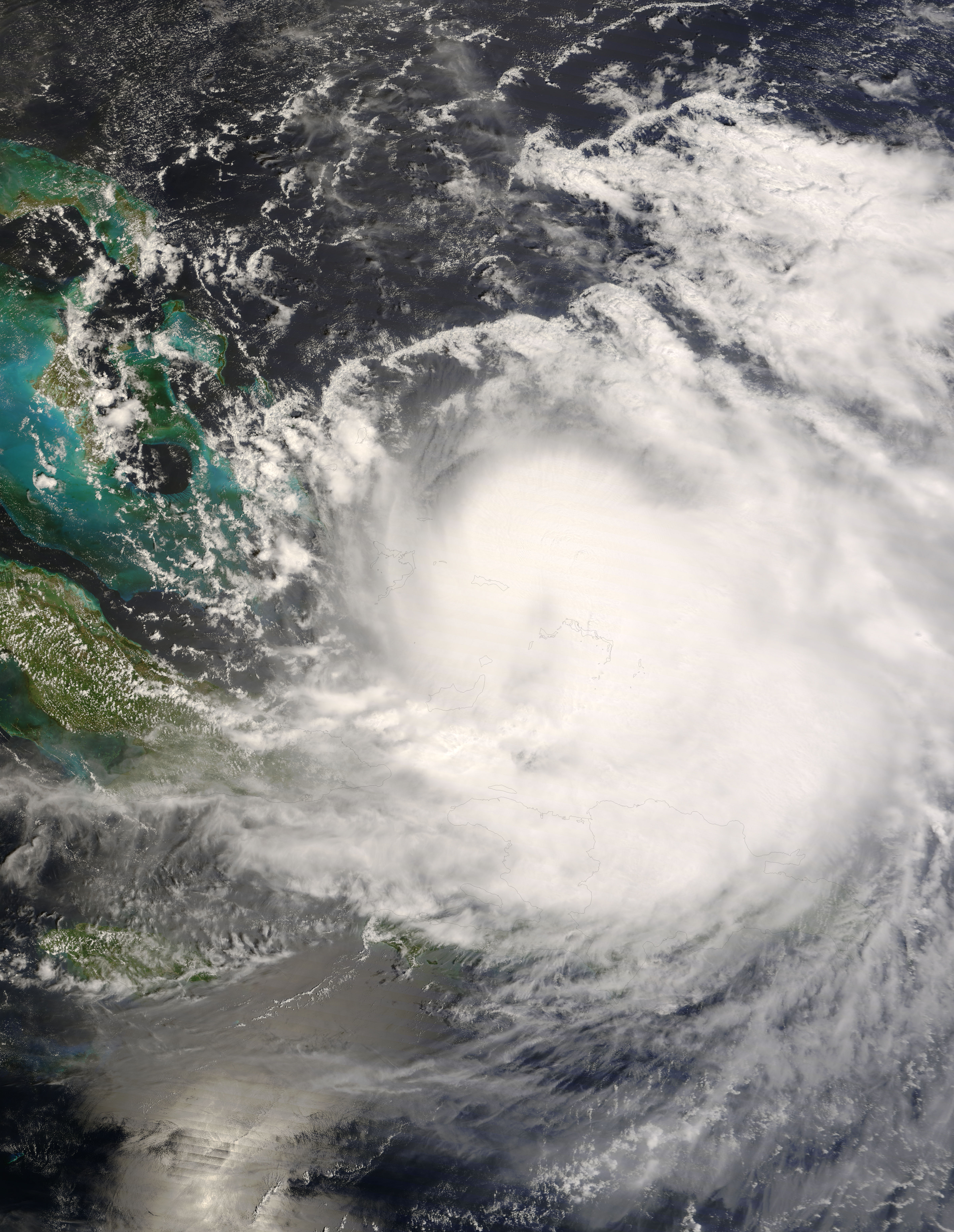
Hurricane Hanna at peak intensity

- 0600 UTC (2:00 a.m. AST) – Tropical Depression Nine forms from a tropical wave roughly 675 mi (1,085 km) west of the Cape Verde Islands.
- 1200 UTC (8:00 a.m. AST) – Tropical Depression Nine strengthens into Tropical Storm Ike.
- 1500 UTC (10:00 a.m. CDT) – Hurricane Gustav makes landfall near Cocodrie, Louisiana with winds of 100 mph (160 km/h).
- 1800 UTC (2:00 p.m. AST) – Tropical Storm Hanna strengthens into a Category 1 hurricane north of the Dominican Republic.

September 2

- 0000 UTC (7:00 p.m. CDT September 1) – Hurricane Gustav weakens to a tropical storm over southwestern Louisiana.
- 0000 UTC (8:00 p.m. AST September 2) – Hurricane Hanna reaches its peak intensity with winds of 85 mph (135 km/h) and a minimum barometric pressure of 977 mbar (28.9 inHg). Additionally, the system makes landfall near Providencials Island, Caicos Islands at this intensity.
- 0000 UTC (8:00 p.m. AST September 1) – Tropical Depression Ten forms from a tropical wave roughly 275 mi (445 km) south-southeast of Sal, Cape Verde Islands.
- 0600 UTC (2:00 a.m. AST) – Tropical Depression Ten strengthens into Tropical Storm Josephine.
- 1200 UTC (7:00 a.m. CDT) – Tropical Storm Gustav weakens to a tropical depression.
- 1200 UTC (8:00 a.m. AST) – Hurricane Hanna weakens to a tropical storm.

September 3

- 0600 UTC (2:00 a.m. AST) – Tropical Storm Josephine reaches its peak intensity with winds of 65 mph (105 km/h) and a minimum barometric pressure of 994 mbar (29.4 inHg).
- 1800 UTC (2:00 p.m. AST) – Tropical Storm Ike strengthens into a Category 1 hurricane roughly 600 mi (965 km) east-northwest of the northern Leeward Islands.
- 1900 UTC (3:00 p.m. AST) – Tropical Storm Hanna makes landfall near Middle Caicos Island with winds of 60 mph (95 km/h).

September 4

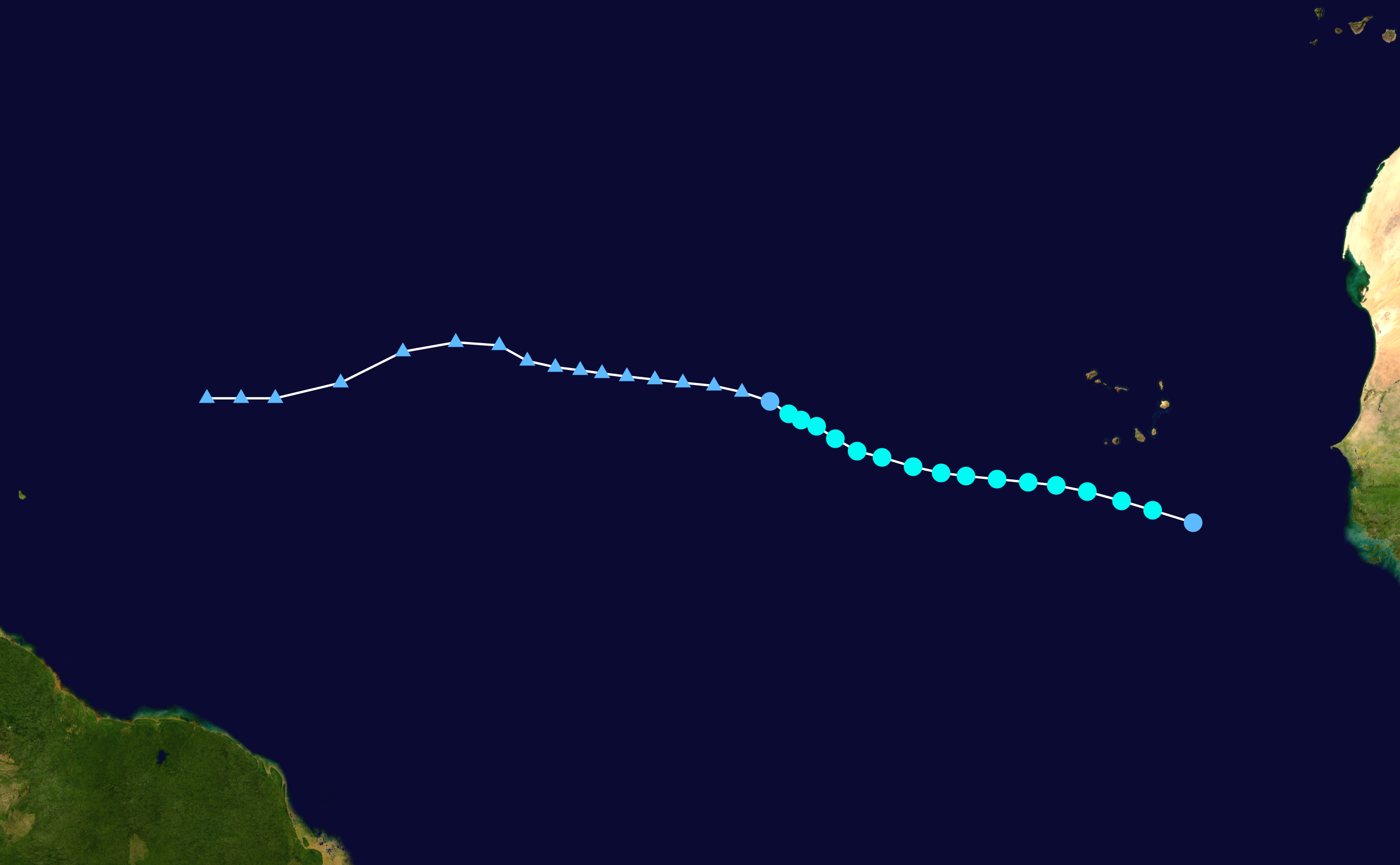
Track map of Tropical Storm Josephine

- 0000 UTC (8:00 p.m. AST September 3) – Hurricane Ike rapidly strengthens into a Category 3 hurricane.
- 0600 UTC (2:00 a.m. AST) – Hurricane Ike reaches its peak intensity with winds of 145 mph (233 km/h) and a minimum barometric pressure of 935 mbar (27.6 inHg).
- 1200 UTC (7:00 a.m. CDT) – Tropical Depression Gustav transitions into an extratropical cyclone over Missouri.

September 5

- 1200 UTC (8:00 a.m. AST) – Hurricane Ike weakens to a Category 3 hurricane.

September 6

- 0000 UTC (8:00 p.m. AST September 5) – Tropical Storm Josephine weakens to a tropical depression.
- 0600 UTC (2:00 a.m. AST) – Tropical Depression Josephine degenerates into a non-convective remnant low-pressure area.
- 0720 UTC (3:20 a.m. EDT) – Tropical Storm Hanna makes landfall near the North Carolina/South Carolina border with winds of 70 mph (115 km/h).
- 1200 UTC (8:00 a.m. AST) – Hurricane Ike weakens to a Category 2 hurricane.
- 1800 UTC (2:00 p.m. AST) – Hurricane Ike rapidly strengthens to a Category 4 hurricane.

September 7

- 0600 UTC (2:00 a.m. EDT) – Tropical Storm Hanna transitions into an extratropical cyclone.
- 1200 UTC (8:00 a.m. AST) – Hurricane Ike weakens to a Category 3 hurricane.
- 1300 UTC (9:00 a.m. EDT) – Hurricane Ike makes landfall on Great Inagua Island, Bahamas with winds of 125 mph (200 km/h).

September 8

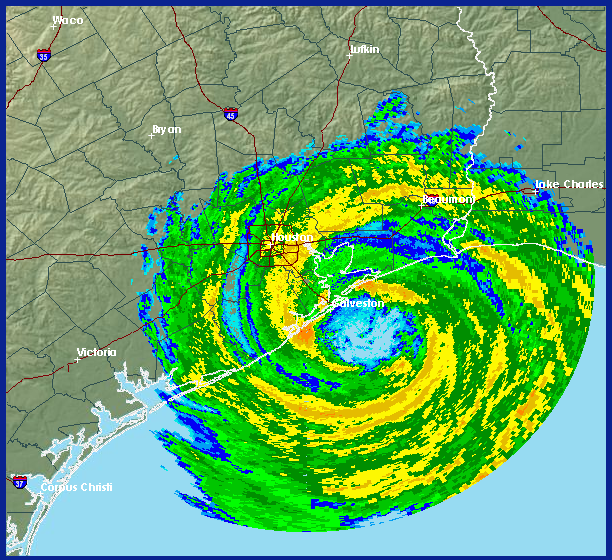
Hurricane Ike prior to making landfall on the Texas coastline

- 0000 UTC (8:00 p.m. EDT September 7) – Hurricane Ike restrengthens to a Category 4 hurricane.
- 0215 UTC (10:15 p.m. EDT) – Hurricane Ike makes landfall near Cabo Lucrecia, Cuba with winds of 135 mph (215 km/h).
- 0600 UTC (2:00 a.m. EDT) – Hurricane Ike weakens to a Category 3 hurricane.
- 1200 UTC (8:00 a.m. EDT) – Hurricane Ike weakens to a Category 2 hurricane.
- 1800 UTC (2:00 p.m. EDT) – Hurricane Ike weakens to a Category 1 hurricane.

September 9

- 1400 UTC (10:00 a.m. EDT) – Hurricane Ike makes landfall near Punta La Capitana, Cuba with winds of 80 mph (130 km/h).

September 10

- 1800 UTC (2:00 p.m. EDT) – Hurricane Ike restrengthens into a Category 2 hurricane.

September 13

- 0700 UTC (2:00 a.m. CDT) – Hurricane Ike makes landfall at the north end of Galveston Island, Texas with winds of 110 mph (175 km/h).
- 1800 UTC (1:00 p.m. CDT) – Hurricane Ike rapidly weakens to a tropical storm.

September 14

- 1200 UTC (7:00 a.m. CDT) – Tropical Storm Ike transitions into an extratropical cyclone.

September 25

- 0000 UTC (8:00 p.m. AST September 24) – A tropical depression forms from a tropical wave about 100 mi (160 km) north of the Dominican Republic.
- 0600 UTC (2:00 a.m. AST) – The tropical depression north of the Dominican Republic strengthens into Tropical Storm Kyle.

September 27

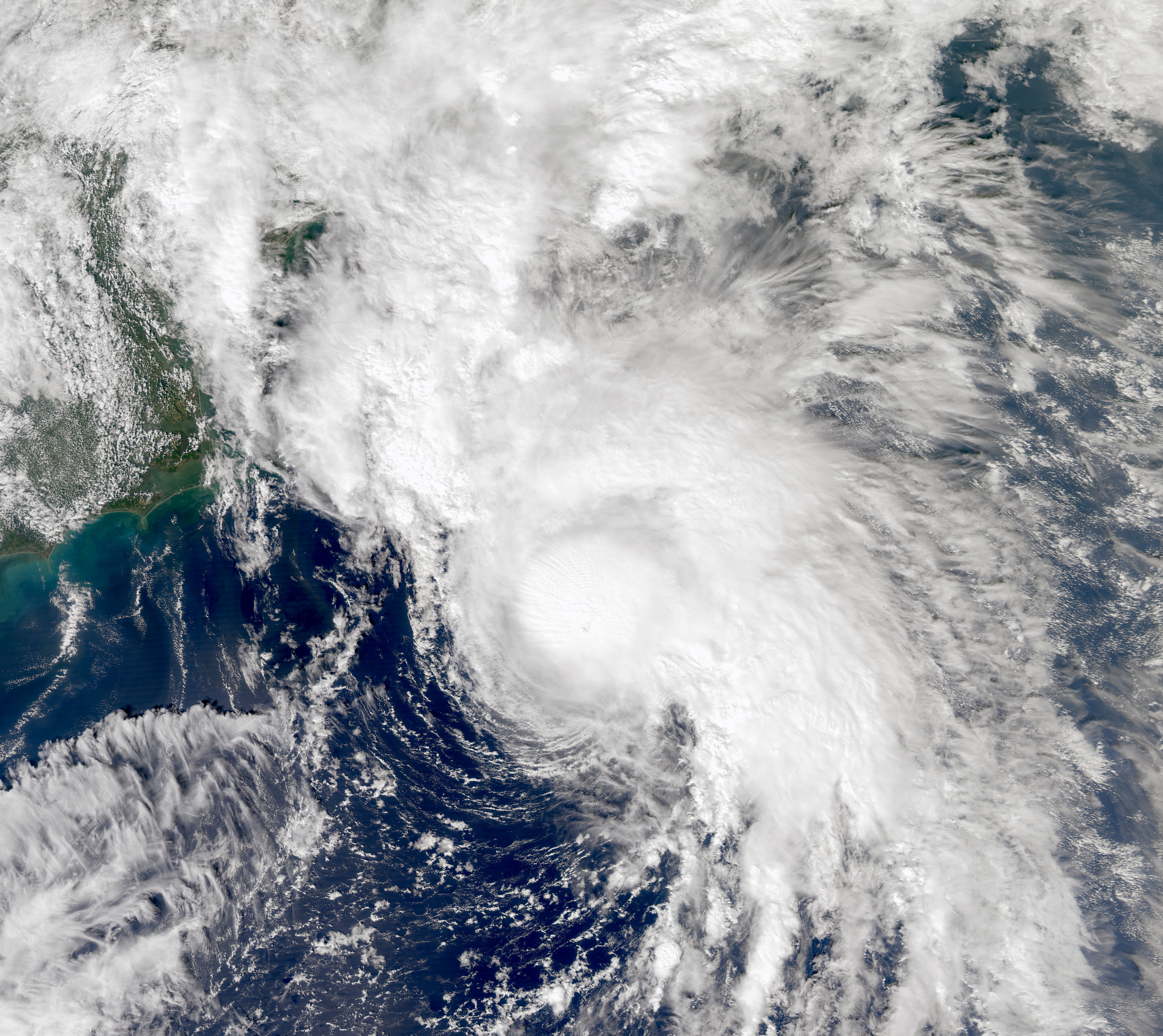
Hurricane Kyle near peak intensity

- 1200 UTC (8:00 a.m. AST) – Tropical Storm Kyle strengthens into a Category 1 hurricane roughly 300 mi (485 km) west of Bermuda.

September 28

- 1200 UTC (8:00 a.m. AST) – Hurricane Kyle reaches its maximum intensity with winds of 85 mph (135 km/h).
- 1800 UTC (2:00 p.m. AST) – Hurricane Kyle reaches its minimum barometric pressure of 984 mbar (29.1 inHg).

September 29

- 0000 UTC (8:00 p.m. AST September 28) – Hurricane Kyle makes landfall near Yarmouth, Nova Scotia with winds of 75 mph (120 km/h).
- 0600 UTC (2:00 a.m. AST) – Hurricane Kyle weakens to a tropical storm and transitions into an extratropical cyclone.
- 0600 UTC (2:00 a.m. AST) – Subtropical Laura forms from an extratropical low pressure area roughly 650 mi (1,045 km) south-southeast of Cape Race, Newfoundland.

September 30

- 1200 UTC (8:00 a.m. AST) – Subtropical Storm Laura transitions into a tropical storm.
- 1800 UTC (2:00 p.m. AST) – Tropical Storm Laura reaches its minimum barometric pressure of 994 mbar (29.4 inHg).

=== October ===
October 1

- 1200 UTC (8:00 a.m. AST) – Tropical Storm Laura degenerates into a non-convective remnant low pressure area.

October 6

- 0000 UTC (7:00 p.m. CDT October 5) – Tropical Depression Thirteen forms from an area of low pressure over Terminos Lagoon, Campeche.
- 1200 UTC (7:00 a.m. CDT) – Tropical Depression Thirteen strengthens into Tropical Storm Marco roughly 60 mi (97 km) northeast of Coatzacoalcos, Mexico.

October 7

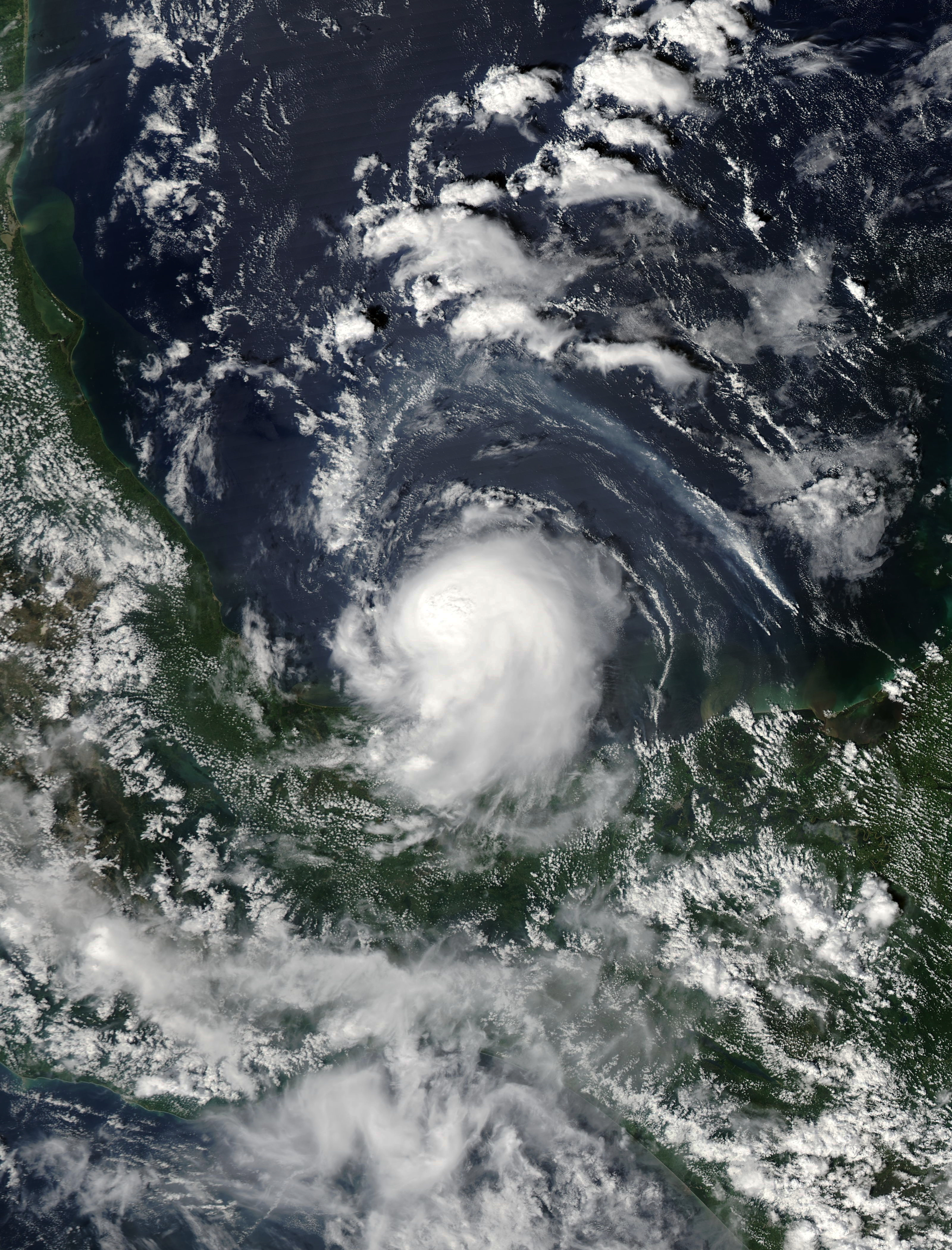
Tropical Storm Marco near peak intensity on October 6

- 0000 UTC (7:00 p.m. CDT October 6) – Tropical Storm Marco reaches its peak intensity of 65 mph (105 km/h) and a minimum barometric pressure of 998 mbar (29.5 inHg).
- 1200 UTC (7:00 a.m. CDT) –Tropical Storm Marco makes landfall east of Misantla, Veracruz with winds of 65 mph (105 km/h).
- 1800 UTC (1:00 p.m. CDT) – Tropical Storm Marco weakens to a tropical depression.

October 8

- 0000 UTC (7:00 p.m. CDT) – Tropical Depression Marco dissipates over the mountainous terrain of inland Mexico.

October 12

- 0600 UTC (2:00 a.m. AST) – A tropical depression forms from an area of low pressure roughly 690 mi (1,110 km) west of the Cape Verde Islands.
- 1200 UTC (8:00 a.m. AST) – The tropical depression west of the Cape Verde Islands strengthens into Tropical Storm Nana.

October 13

- 0000 UTC (8:00 p.m. AST October 12) – Tropical Storm Nana reaches its peak intensity of 40 mph (64 km/h) and a barometric pressure of 1,004 mbar (29.6 inHg).
- 0600 UTC (2:00 a.m. AST) – Tropical Depression Fifteen forms from an area of low pressure roughly 165 mi (266 km) south of the southeastern tip of Dominican Republic.
- 1200 UTC (8:00 a.m. AST) – Tropical Storm Nana weakens to a tropical depression roughly 870 mi (1,400 km) west of the Cape Verde Islands.

October 14

- 0000 UTC (8:00 p.m. AST) – Tropical Depression Fifteen strengthens into Tropical Storm Omar roughly 125 mi (201 km) north-northeast of Aruba.
- 1200 UTC (8:00 a.m. AST) – Tropical Depression Nana degenerates into a non-convective remnant low pressure area in the central Atlantic.
- 1200 UTC (8:00 a.m. AST) – Tropical Depression Sixteen forms from a tropical wave roughly 45 mi (72 km) northeast of the coast of the Nicaragua/Honduras border. At this time, the depression also reaches its peak intensity of 30 mph (48 km/h) and a minimum barometric pressure of 1,004 mbar (29.6 inHg).
- 1230 UTC (8:30 a.m. EDT) – Tropical Depression Sixteen makes landfall just west of Punta Patuca, Honduras with winds of 30 mph (48 km/h).

October 15

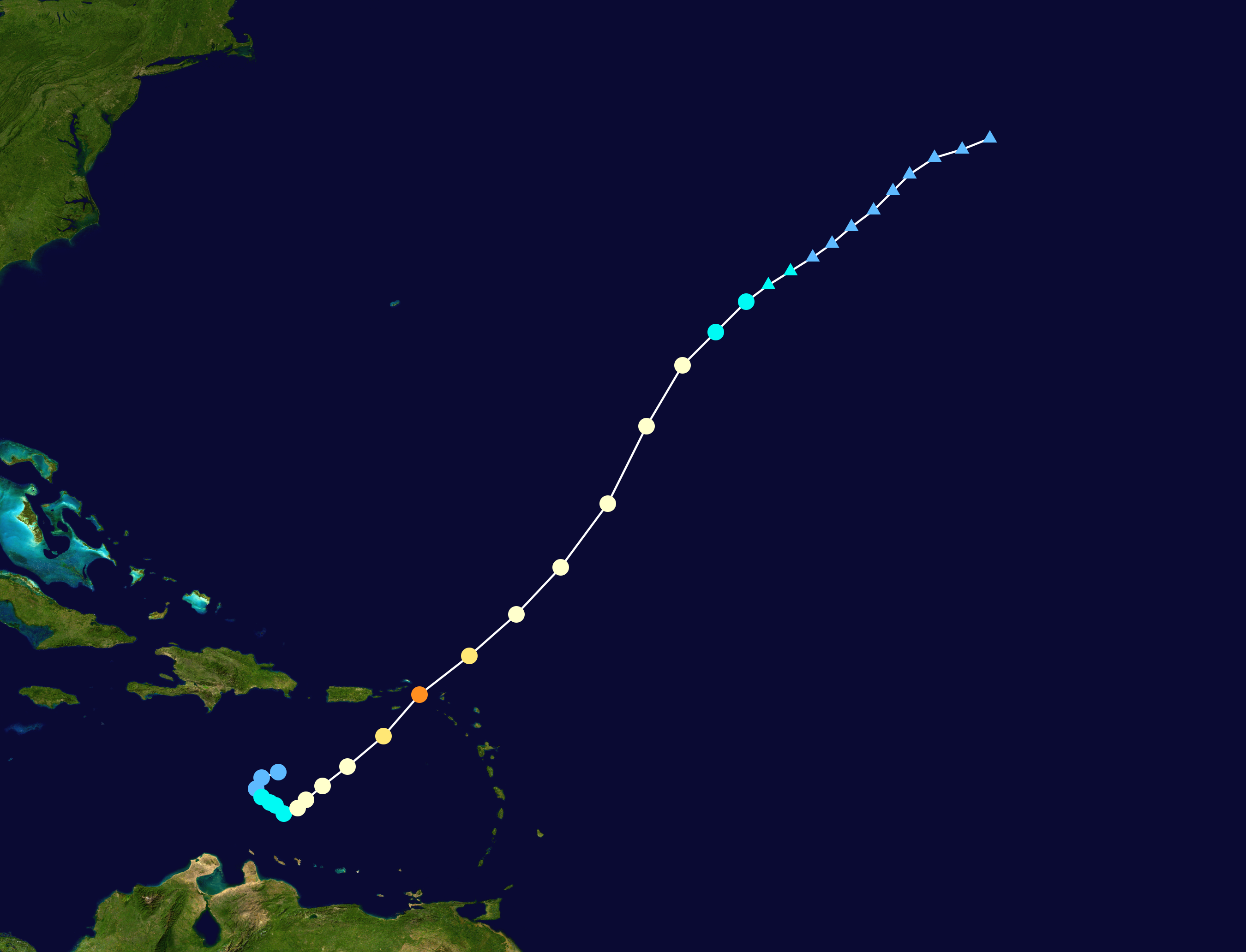
Track map of Hurricane Omar

- 0000 UTC (8:00 p.m. AST October 14) – Tropical Storm Omar strengthens into a Category 1 hurricane.

October 16

- 0000 UTC (8:00 p.m. AST October 15) – Hurricane Omar strengthens into a Category 2 hurricane.
- 0000 UTC (8:00 p.m. AST October 15) – Tropical Depression Sixteen degenerates into a non-convective remnant low pressure area over the mountainous terrain of east-central Honduras.
- 0600 UTC (2:00 a.m. AST) – Hurricane Omar rapidly strengthens into a Category 4 hurricane. At this time, Omar also reaches its peak intensity with winds of 135 mph (217 km/h) and a minimum barometric pressure of 958 mbar (28.3 inHg).
- 1200 UTC (8:00 a.m. AST) – Hurricane Omar weakens to a Category 2 hurricane.
- 1800 UTC (2:00 p.m. AST) – Hurricane Omar weakens to a Category 1 hurricane.

October 18

- 0000 UTC (8:00 p.m. AST October 17) – Hurricane Omar weakens to a tropical storm.
- 1200 UTC (8:00 a.m. AST) – Tropical Storm Omar degenerates into a non-convective remnant low-pressure area.

=== November ===
November 5

- 1800 UTC (2:00 p.m. EDT) – Tropical Depression Seventeen develops in the southwestern Caribbean Sea roughly 115 mi (185 km) southeast of the Nicaragua/Honduras border.

November 6

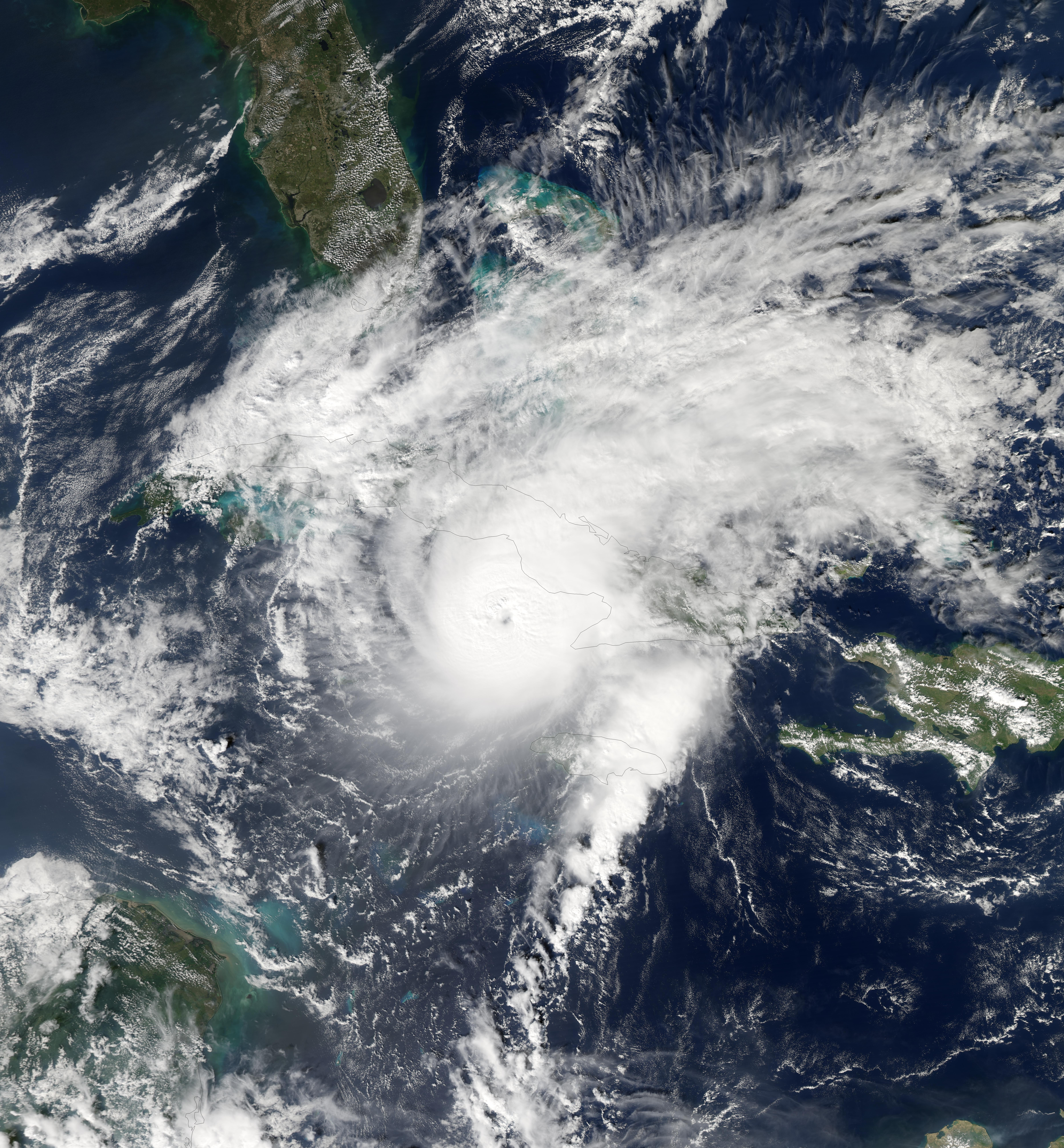
Hurricane Paloma shortly after attaining its peak intensity

- 0600 UTC (2:00 a.m. EDT) – Tropical Depression Seventeen strengthens into Tropical Storm Paloma roughly 60 mi (97 km) east of the Nicaragua/Honduras border.

November 7

- 0000 UTC (8:00 p.m. EDT November 6) – Tropical Storm Paloma rapidly intensifies into a Category 1 hurricane.

November 8

- 0000 UTC (8:00 p.m. EDT November 7) – Hurricane Paloma strengthens into a Category 3 hurricane.
- 1200 UTC (8:00 a.m. EDT) – Hurricane Paloma strengthens into a Category 4 hurricane and attains its peak intensity with winds of 145 mph (233 km/h) and a minimum barometric pressure of 944 mbar (27.9 inHg).
- 2300 UTC (7:00 p.m. EDT) – Hurricane Paloma rapidly weakens into a Category 2 hurricane and makes landfall in Cuba with winds of 110 mph (180 km/h).

November 9

- 0100 UTC (9:00 p.m. EDT) – Hurricane Paloma makes landfall near Santa Cruz del Sur, Camagüey, Cuba with winds of 100 mph (160 km/h).
- 0600 UTC (2:00 a.m. EDT) – Hurricane Paloma weakens to a tropical storm over Cuba.
- 1800 UTC (2:00 p.m. EDT) – Tropical Storm Paloma weakens to a tropical depression.

November 10

- 0000 UTC (8:00 p.m. EDT November 9) – Tropical Depression Paloma degenerates into a non-convective remnant low pressure area over Cuba.

November 30

- The 2008 Atlantic hurricane season officially ends.

== See also ==
- Lists of Atlantic hurricanes
- Timeline of the 2008 Pacific hurricane season
