= Hurricane Bertha (2008) =

Category 3 Atlantic hurricane in 2008

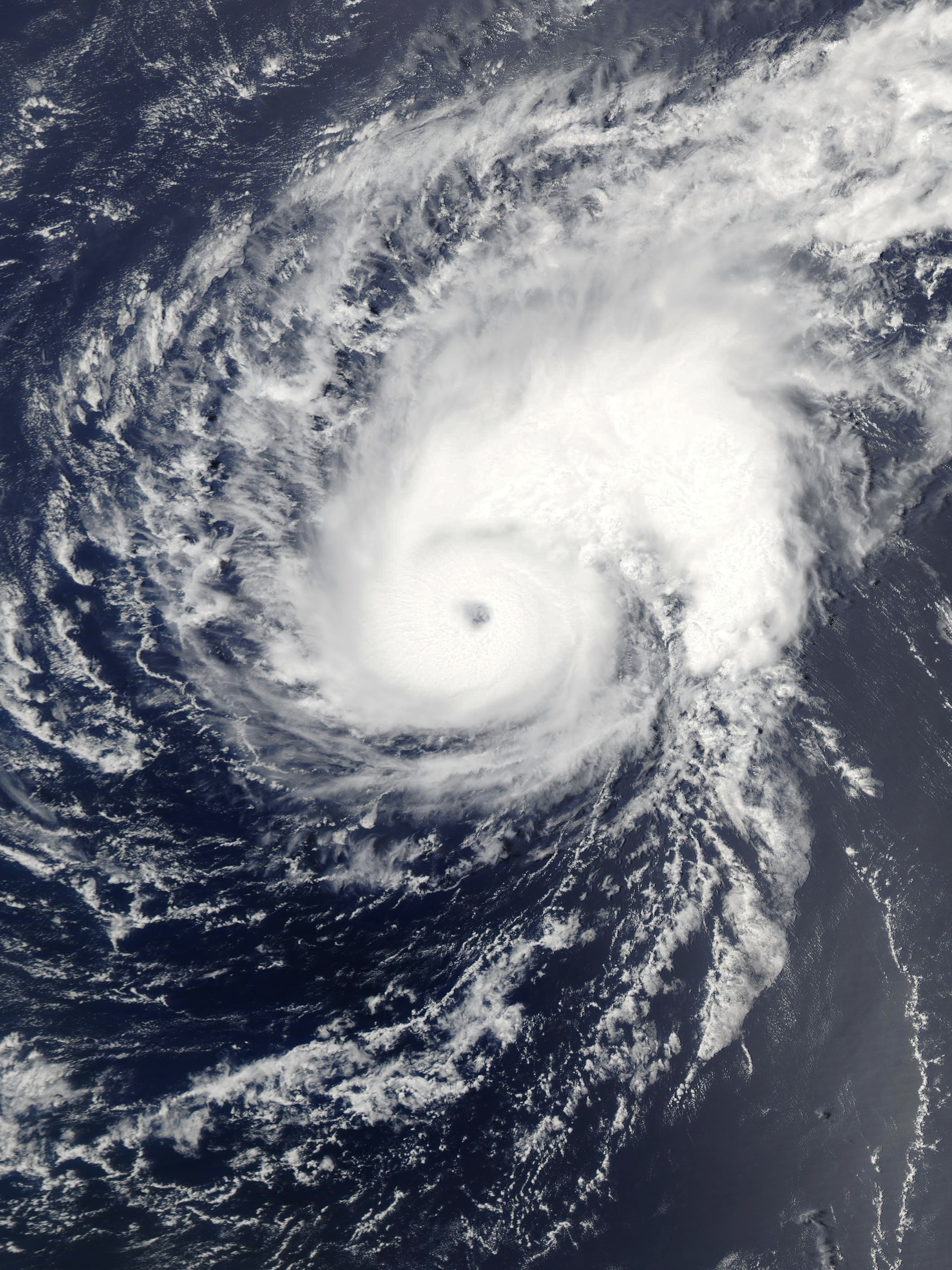
- Bertha near peak intensity on July 7

Meteorological history
- Formed: July 3, 2008
- Extratropical: July 20, 2008
- Dissipated: July 21, 2008

Category 3 major hurricane
- 1-minute sustained (SSHWS/NWS)
- Highest winds: 125 mph (205 km/h)
- Lowest pressure: 952 mbar (hPa); 28.11 inHg

Overall effects
- Fatalities: 3 direct
- Damage: Minimal
- Areas affected: East Coast of the United States, Bermuda
- IBTrACS
- Part of the 2008 Atlantic hurricane season

Hurricane Bertha was the longest-lived Atlantic tropical cyclone on record during July, as well as the furthest east system to attain tropical storm intensity during the month. The second named storm, first hurricane, and first major hurricane of the active 2008 season, Bertha developed into a tropical depression on July 3 from a tropical wave that departed western Africa two days prior. On a west-northwest to northwest track, the depression intensified into Tropical Storm Bertha six hours formation and ultimately attained hurricane intensity on July 7. A period of rapid deepening brought the cyclone to its peak as a Category 3 hurricane with winds of 125 mph (205 km/h) late that afternoon. Changes in wind shear and the storm's internal structure allowed Bertha to fluctuate in intensity over the next week as it passed very near Bermuda, but a track over cooler waters eventually caused the system to become an extratropical cyclone by July 20. It continued northeast and was absorbed by another low near Iceland the following day. Rough surf propelled by Bertha killed three people along the East Coast of the United States; hundreds of other swimmers were injured and/or required rescuing. In Bermuda, some streets were flooded and strong gusts cut power to approximately 7,500 homes; only minor damage was observed.

== Meteorological history ==
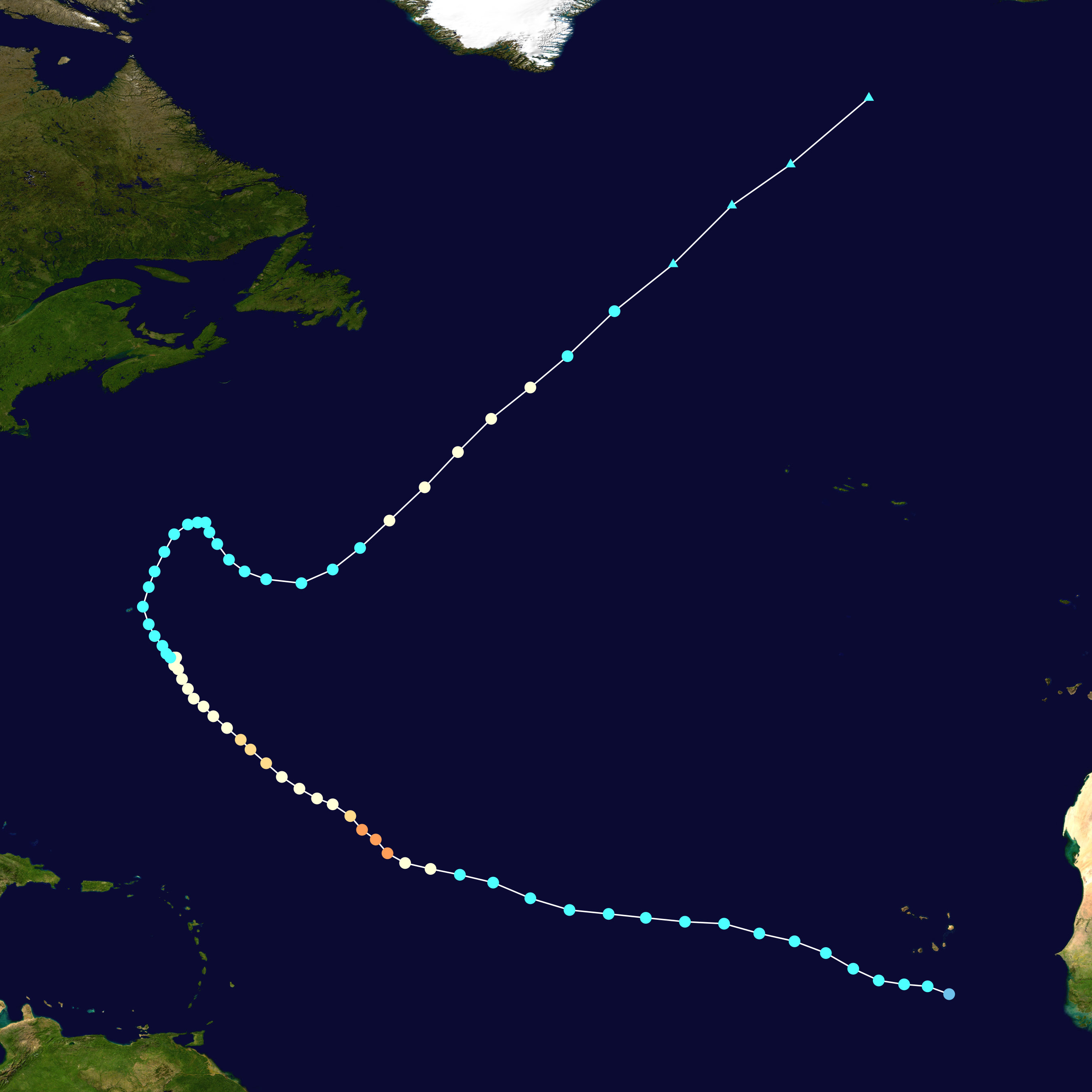
Map plotting the storm's track and intensity, according to the Saffir–Simpson scale Map key Saffir–Simpson scale Tropical depression (≤38 mph, ≤62 km/h) Tropical storm (39–73 mph, 63–118 km/h) Category 1 (74–95 mph, 119–153 km/h) Category 2 (96–110 mph, 154–177 km/h) Category 3 (111–129 mph, 178–208 km/h) Category 4 (130–156 mph, 209–251 km/h) Category 5 (≥157 mph, ≥252 km/h) Unknown Storm type Tropical cyclone Subtropical cyclone Extratropical cyclone, remnant low, tropical disturbance, or monsoon depression

On July 1, the National Hurricane Center (NHC) began monitoring a vigorous tropical wave, accompanied by both a weak surface low and a large area of shower and thunderstorm activity, just off the western coast of Africa. The disturbance began to show signs of organization early on July 2; satellite imagery the next morning showcased deep convection over the apparent center and increasingly pronounced banding features in the northwestern quadrant. Thus, in conjunction with satellite wind data, the storm was classified as a tropical depression by 06:00 UTC on July 3, located about 255 miles (410 km) south-southeast of Cabo Verde. The NHC noted that global modelling suggested the possibility of tropical development over a week prior, a "remarkable achievement" at the time. The storm's cloud pattern continued to coalesce, and it was upgraded to Tropical Storm Bertha six hours later.

On the southern periphery of a mid-level ridge over the open Atlantic, Bertha moved swiftly west-northwest to northwest for several days. Despite being embedded within an environment of low vertical wind shear, the storm passed over ocean temperatures near 77 °F (25 °C), and its overall appearance was characterized by intermittent bursts of deep convection near the center. Eventually, by late on July 5, Bertha began to enter warmer waters and gain organization. Convection coalesced throughout July 6, and a series of microwave passes later that day indicated the formation of an eye-like feature, despite some tilt to Bertha's low- and mid-level circulations. Rapid deepening ensued as the aforementioned eye became readily apparent and convection in the eyewall cooled; Bertha became the season's first hurricane around 06:00 UTC on July 7, and by 21:00 UTC that afternoon, attained its peak as a Category 3 major hurricane with winds of 125 mph (205 km/h) and a minimum barometric pressure of 952 mbar (hPa; 28.12 inHg).

The cyclone's rapid intensification phase was equaled by a rapid weakening phase almost immediately after peak intensity, and Bertha fell to minimal hurricane intensity by 06:00 UTC on July 9 under the influence of strong wind shear. These unfavorable winds quickly slackened, allowing Bertha to regain Category 2 intensity by 18:00 UTC that day, before the hurricane began an eyewall replacement cycle. A weak steering regime directed the storm just east of Bermuda as it weakened to a tropical storm on July 13, and a large upper-level low over the central Atlantic steered it east and southeast. After generally maintaining its strength for several days, an eye redeveloped and convection became more symmetric about the feature on July 18, prompting the NHC to upgrade Bertha to a hurricane around 18:00 UTC that day. The storm rapidly accelerated ahead of a trough off the East Coast of the United States, forcing Bertha into rapidly cooler waters. Its wind field became extremely asymmetric and deep convection near the center dissipated, indicative of an extratropical transition that Bertha completed by 12:00 UTC on July 20. The post-tropical cyclone continued northeast and merged with a larger mid-latitude low near Iceland the next day.

== Preparations, impact, and records ==
Tropical Storm Bertha near Bermuda on July 14

As a tropical storm, Bertha dropped rainfall over the southern Cape Verde islands. No damages or deaths were reported.

On July 7, Bermuda residents began purchasing lamps, tarpaulins and flashlights in anticipation of Hurricane Bertha. In the sudden rush, some stores sold out of batteries. The Emergency Measures Organisation urged the public to monitor forecasts and remain away from beaches. The Bermuda Weather Service, meanwhile, hoisted tropical cyclone warnings and watches for the island upon its approach. On July 10, the Department of Parks placed high surf warning signs along the South Shore beaches as Bertha sent strong waves ahead of its path. Barricades were erected at all of the island's beaches, which were closed to swimming and watersports.

All flights into and out of Bermuda were disrupted on July 14 as the storm made its final approach to the island. JetBlue and Delta Air Lines cancelled their flights, while American Airlines executed its flights to Miami and New York a day early, and British Airways delayed its flight to the afternoon. Ferry service and traffic to St. George's was cancelled for the whole day. Some roads were flooded, and tree branches were broken by wind gusts that reached 91 mph (146 km/h) at an elevated weather station on the island. Downed power lines cut electricity to approximately 7,500 homes, but engineers from the Bermuda Electric Light Company Limited worked quickly to restore service. A total of 4.77 in (121 mm) of rainfall fell at the L.F. Wade International Airport.

The hurricane produced strong waves and rip currents along the East Coast of the United States, which caused three deaths along the coastline of New Jersey. On July 12, a 51-year-old man died after suddenly losing consciousness during his rescue. On July 13, three men swam out to a buoy about 300 ft (91.4 m) off the coast of Wildwood Beach when they were overcome by the rough surf. One swimmer was found unconscious in the water and pronounced dead at the scene, the second was never found and presumed dead, and the third was rescued. During the event, a total of 57 people had to be rescued along the coast of New Jersey. Three rip currents also caused 55 injuries throughout beaches in Delaware. The injuries ranged from minor scrapes to broken bones. Four people were also injured in North Carolina, one of which nearly drowned as he had aspirated water shortly before a lifeguard rescued him. At least 60 people had to be rescued from the rough seas over a two-day span.

Lasting 17 days, Hurricane Bertha holds the records for the longest-lived July Atlantic tropical cyclone on record. It also set the record for the easternmost-forming tropical storm during the month, at 24.7°W.

== See also ==
- Other tropical cyclones of the same name
- List of Atlantic hurricanes
- List of Bermuda hurricanes
- List of wettest tropical cyclones by country
- Timeline of the 2008 Atlantic hurricane season
