= Timeline of the 2014 Pacific hurricane season =

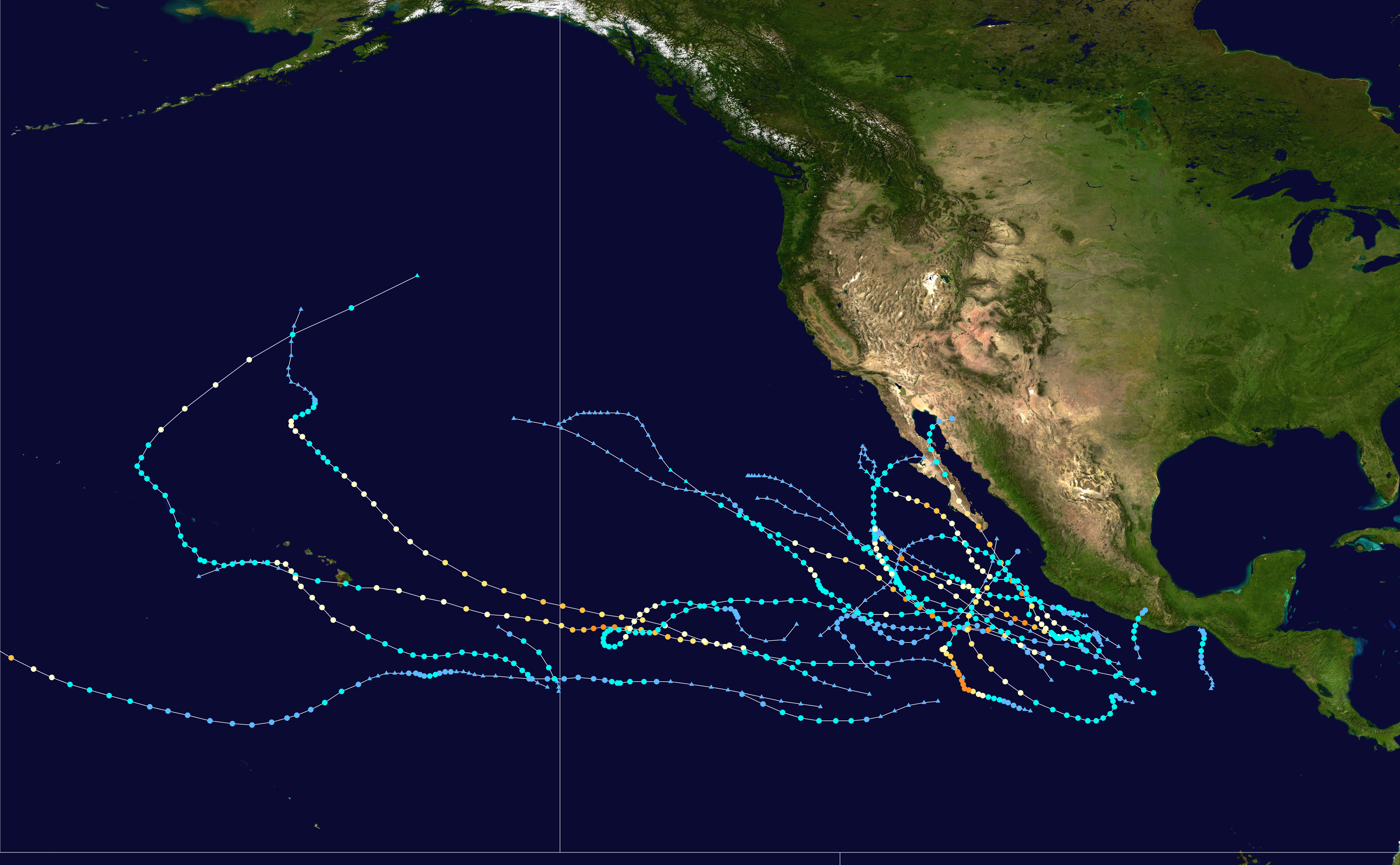
- Season summary map

Season boundaries
- First system formed: May 22, 2014
- Last system dissipated: November 5, 2014

Strongest system
- Name: Marie
- Maximum winds: 160 mph (260 km/h) (1-minute sustained)
- Lowest pressure: 918 mbar (hPa; 27.11 inHg)

Longest lasting system
- Name: Karina
- Duration: 13.75 days
Storm articles
- Hurricane Amanda
- Tropical Storm Boris (2014)
- Hurricane Genevieve (2014)
- Hurricane Iselle
- Hurricane Marie (2014)
- Hurricane Norbert (2014)
- Hurricane Odile
- Hurricane Ana
- Tropical Storm Trudy (2014)

The 2014 Pacific hurricane season consisted of the events that occurred in the annual cycle of tropical cyclone formation over the Pacific Ocean north of the equator and east of the International Date Line. The official bounds of each Pacific hurricane season are dates that conventionally delineate the period each year during which tropical cyclones tend to form in the basin according to the National Hurricane Center (NHC), beginning on May 15 in the Eastern Pacific proper (east of 140°W) and June 1 in the Central Pacific (140°W to the International Date Line), and ending on November 30 in both areas. However, tropical cyclogenesis is possible at any time of year. The first tropical cyclone of the season, Hurricane Amanda, developed on May 22; the final, Hurricane Vance, dissipated on November 5.

On account of several unusually favorable atmospheric and oceanic factors, the 2014 season was one of the most active on record for the basin. It produced twenty-three tropical depressions, of which all but one developed into named tropical storms; sixteen became hurricanes, of which nine further intensified into major hurricanes. (Note: A major hurricane is a Pacific or Atlantic hurricane that reaches Category 3 or higher on the five-level Saffir–Simpson scale, with maximum sustained winds of at least 111 mph (179 km/h).)

This timeline documents tropical cyclone formations, strengthening, weakening, landfalls, extratropical transitions, and dissipations during the season. It includes information that was not released throughout the season, meaning that data from post-storm reviews by the National Hurricane Center and the Central Pacific Hurricane Center, such as a storm that was not initially warned upon, has been included.

The time stamp for each event is first stated using Coordinated Universal Time (UTC), the 24-hour clock where 00:00 = midnight UTC. The NHC uses both UTC and the time zone where the center of the tropical cyclone is currently located. Prior to 2015, two time zones were utilized in the Eastern Pacific basin: Pacific east of 140°W, and Hawaii−Aleutian from 140°W to the International Date Line. In this timeline, the respective area time is included in parentheses. Additionally, figures for maximum sustained winds and position estimates are rounded to the nearest 5 units (miles, or kilometers), following National Hurricane Center practice. Direct wind observations are rounded to the nearest whole number. Atmospheric pressures are listed to the nearest millibar and nearest hundredth of an inch of mercury.

== Timeline ==
=== May ===
May 15

- The 2014 Eastern Pacific hurricane season officially begins.

May 22

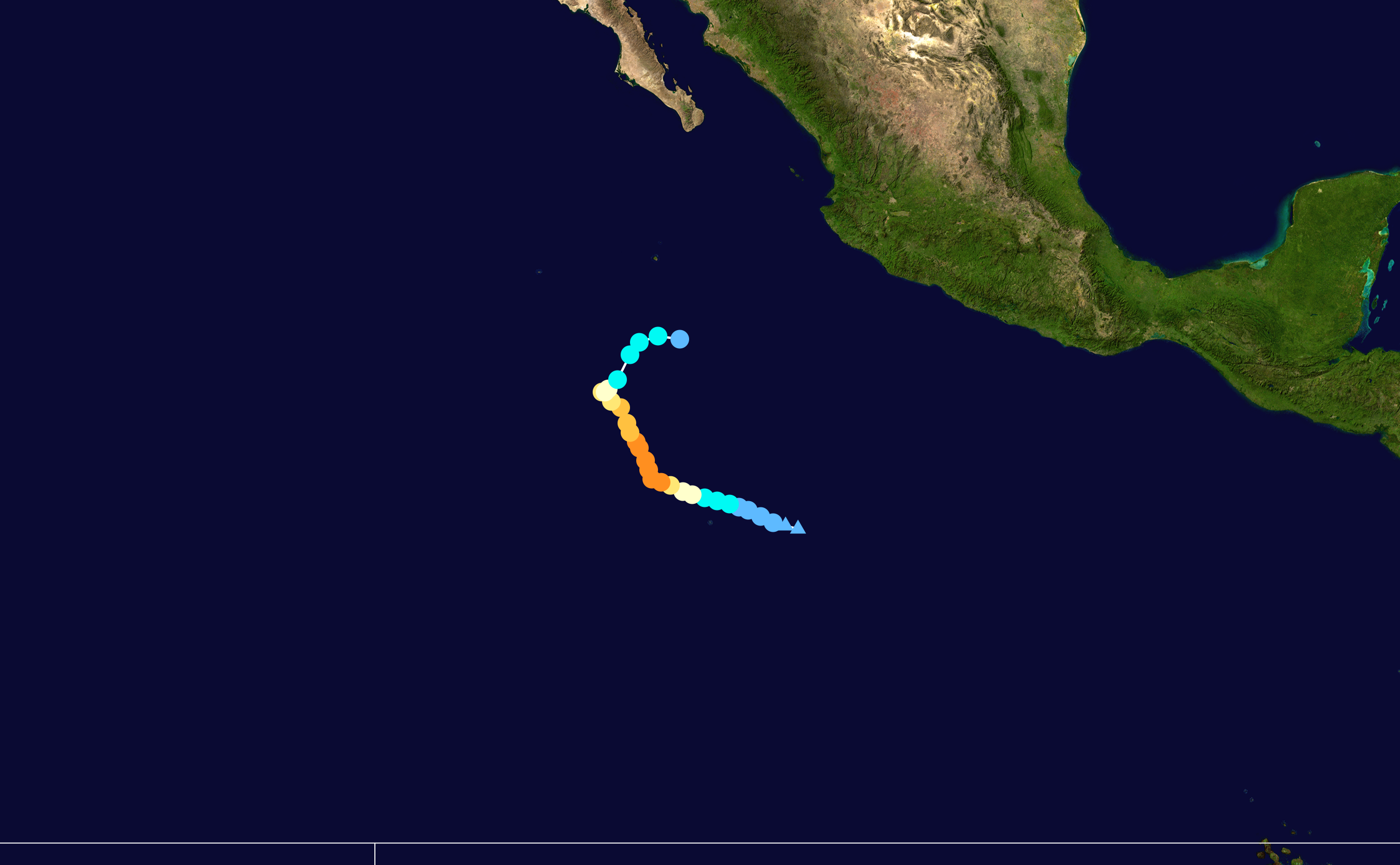
Storm path of Hurricane Amanda

- 18:00 UTC (11:00 a.m. PDT) at 10.3°N 107.2°W – A tropical depression develops from an area of low pressure about 635 mi (1,020 km) south-southwest of Manzanillo, Colima.

May 23

- 18:00 UTC (11:00 a.m. PDT) at 10.9°N 108.6°W – The tropical depression strengthens into Tropical Storm Amanda about 635 mi (1,020 km) south-southwest of Manzanillo, Colima.

May 24

- 12:00 UTC (5:00 a.m. PDT)11.2°N 109.8°W – Tropical Storm Amanda strengthens into a Category 1 hurricane about 655 mi (1,055 km) southwest of Manzanillo, Colima.

May 25

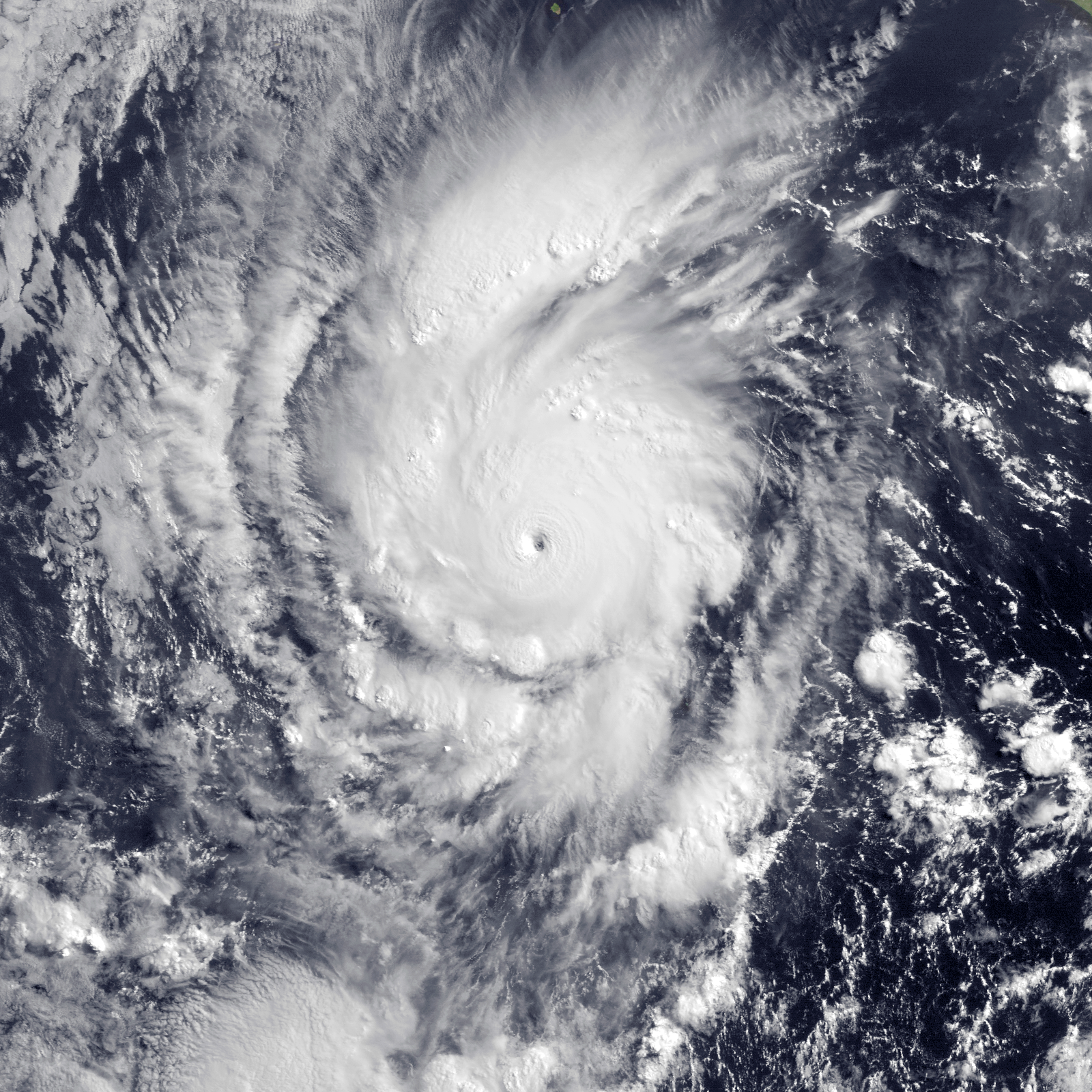
Satellite image of Hurricane Amanda at peak intensity on May 25

- 00:00 UTC (5:00 p.m. PDT, May 24)11.5°N 110.5°W – Hurricane Amanda strengthens to Category 2 intensity about 660 mi (1,065 km) southwest of Manzanillo, Colima.
- 06:00 UTC (11:00 p.m. PDT, May 24)11.6°N 110.8°W – Hurricane Amanda rapidly strengthens to Category 4 intensity, skipping Category 3 status, about 675 mi (1,085 km) southwest of Manzanillo, Colima; this makes it the first major hurricane of the season.
- 12:00 UTC (5:00 a.m. PDT) at 11.7°N 111.1°W – Hurricane Amanda reaches its peak intensity, with maximum sustained winds of 155 mph (250 km/h) and a minimum barometric pressure of 932 mbar (27.52 inHg), about 770 mi (1,240 km) south of the southern tip of Baja California Sur; this makes it the strongest May hurricane on record in the basin.

May 26

- 18:00 UTC (11:00 a.m. PDT) at 13.2°N 111.8°W – Hurricane Amanda weakens to Category 3 intensity about 680 mi (1,095 km) south of the southern tip of Baja California Sur.

May 27

- 12:00 UTC (5:00 a.m. PDT) at 14.2°N 112.4°W – Hurricane Amanda weakens to Category 2 intensity about 620 mi (1,000 km) south-southwest of the southern tip of Baja California Sur.

May 28

- 00:00 UTC (5:00 p.m. PDT, May 27) at 14.5°N 112.6°W – Hurricane Amanda weakens to Category 1 intensity about 605 mi (975 km) south-southwest of the southern tip of Baja California Sur.
- 12:00 UTC (5.00 a.m. PDT) at 14.9°N 112.2°W – Hurricane Amanda weakens into a tropical storm about 570 mi (915 km) south-southwest of the southern tip of Baja California Sur.

May 29

- 12:00 UTC (5:00 a.m. PDT) at 16.2°N 110.2°W – Tropical Storm Amanda weakens into a tropical depression about 460 mi (740 km) south of the southern tip of Baja California Sur; it dissipates a short time later.

=== June ===
June 1

- The 2014 Central Pacific hurricane season officially begins.

June 2

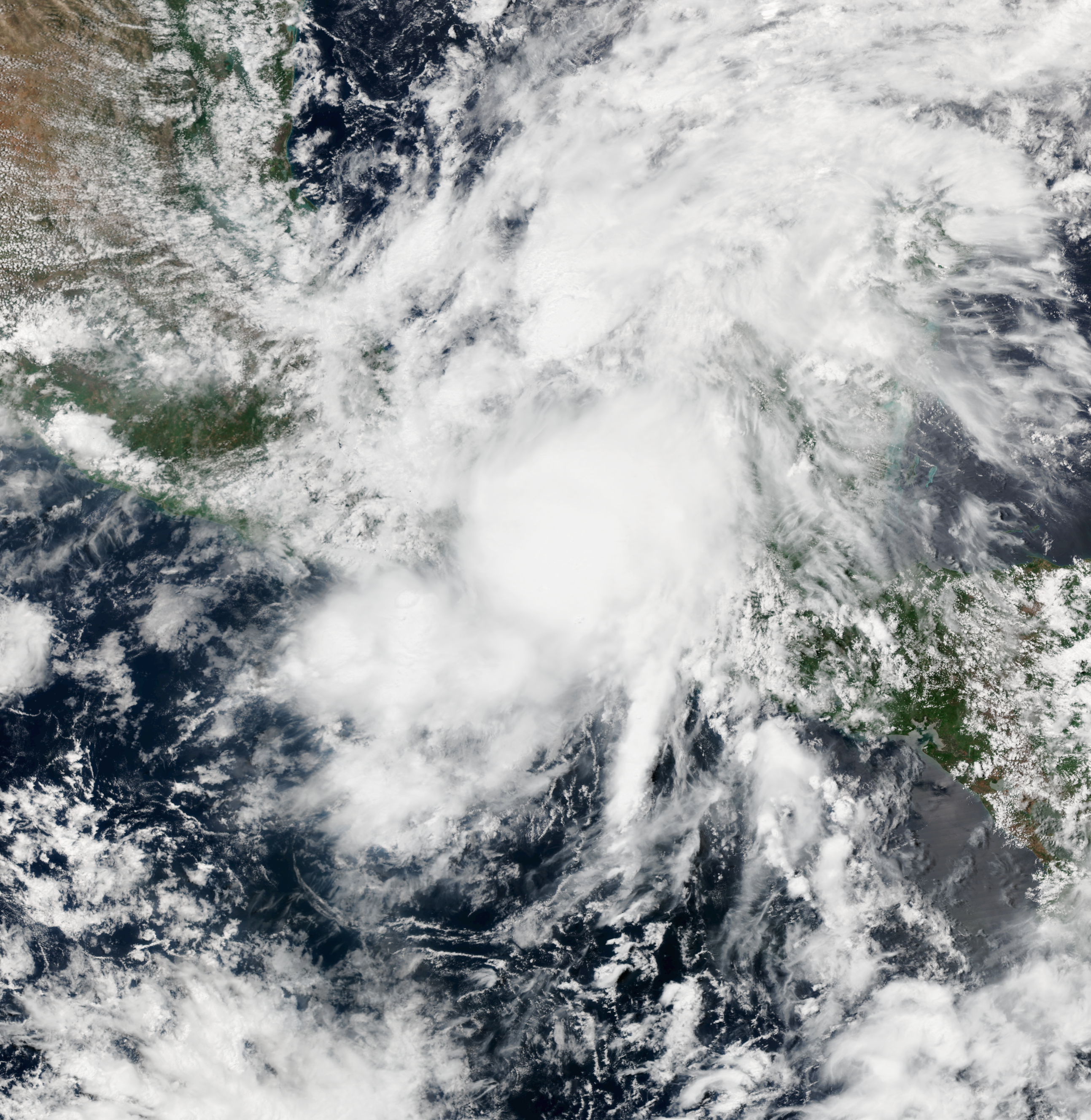
Satellite image of Tropical Storm Boris over the Gulf of Tehuantepec on June 3

- 18:00 UTC (11:00 a.m. PDT) at 13.2°N 94.1°W – Tropical Depression Two-E develops from an area of low pressure about 195 mi (315 km) south of Tonalá, Chiapas.

June 3

- 12:00 UTC (5:00 a.m. PDT) at 14.4°N 94.2°W – Tropical Depression Two-E strengthens into Tropical Storm Boris about 120 mi (195 km) south-southwest of Tonalá, Chiapas.
- 18:00 UTC (11:00 a.m. PDT) at 14.9°N 94.1°W – Tropical Storm Boris reaches its peak intensity, with maximum sustained winds of 45 mph (75 km/h) and a minimum barometric pressure of 998 mbar (29.47 inHg), about 85 mi (140 km) south-southwest of Tonalá, Chiapas.

June 4

- 06:00 UTC (11:00 p.m. PDT, June 3) at 15.6°N 94.0°W – Tropical Storm Boris weakens into a tropical depression about 25 mi (35 km) southwest of Tonalá, Chiapas.
- 18:00 UTC (11:00 a.m. PDT) at 15.9°N 94.3°W – Tropical Depression Boris degenerates into a remnant low about 40 mi (65 km) west-southwest of Tonalá, Chiapas.

June 9

- 12:00 UTC (5:00 a.m. PDT) at 15.2°N 101.5°W – A tropical depression develops from an area of unsettled weather about 155 mi (250 km) southwest of Acapulco, Guerrero.

June 10

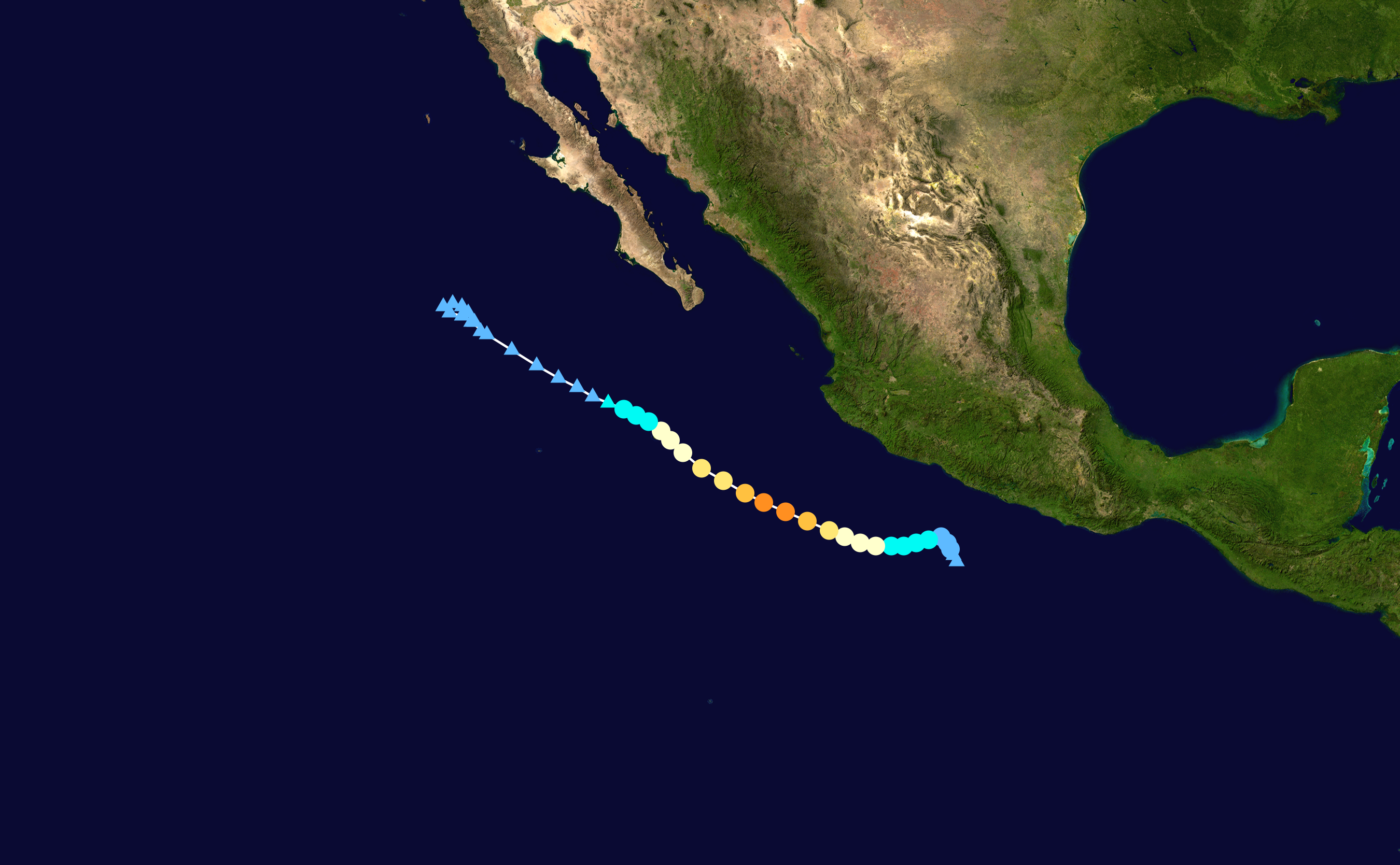
Storm path of Hurricane Cristina

- 06:00 UTC (11:00 p.m. PDT, June 9) at 15.5°N 102.2°W – The tropical depression strengthens into Tropical Storm Cristina about 155 mi (250 km) west-southwest of Acapulco, Guerrero.

June 11

- 06:00 UTC (11:00 p.m. PDT, June 10) at 15.3°N 103.9°W – Tropical Storm Cristina strengthens into a Category 1 hurricane about 290 mi (465 km) west-southwest of Acapulco, Guerrero.

June 12

- 00:00 UTC (5:00 p.m. PDT, June 11) at 15.8°N 105.4°W – Hurricane Cristina strengthens to Category 2 intensity about 375 mi (600 km) west of Acapulco, Guerrero.
- 06:00 UTC (11:00 p.m. PDT, June 11) at 16.1°N 106.1°W – Hurricane Cristina strengthens to Category 3 intensity about 235 mi (380 km) south-southwest of Manzanillo, Colima; this makes it the second major hurricane of the season.

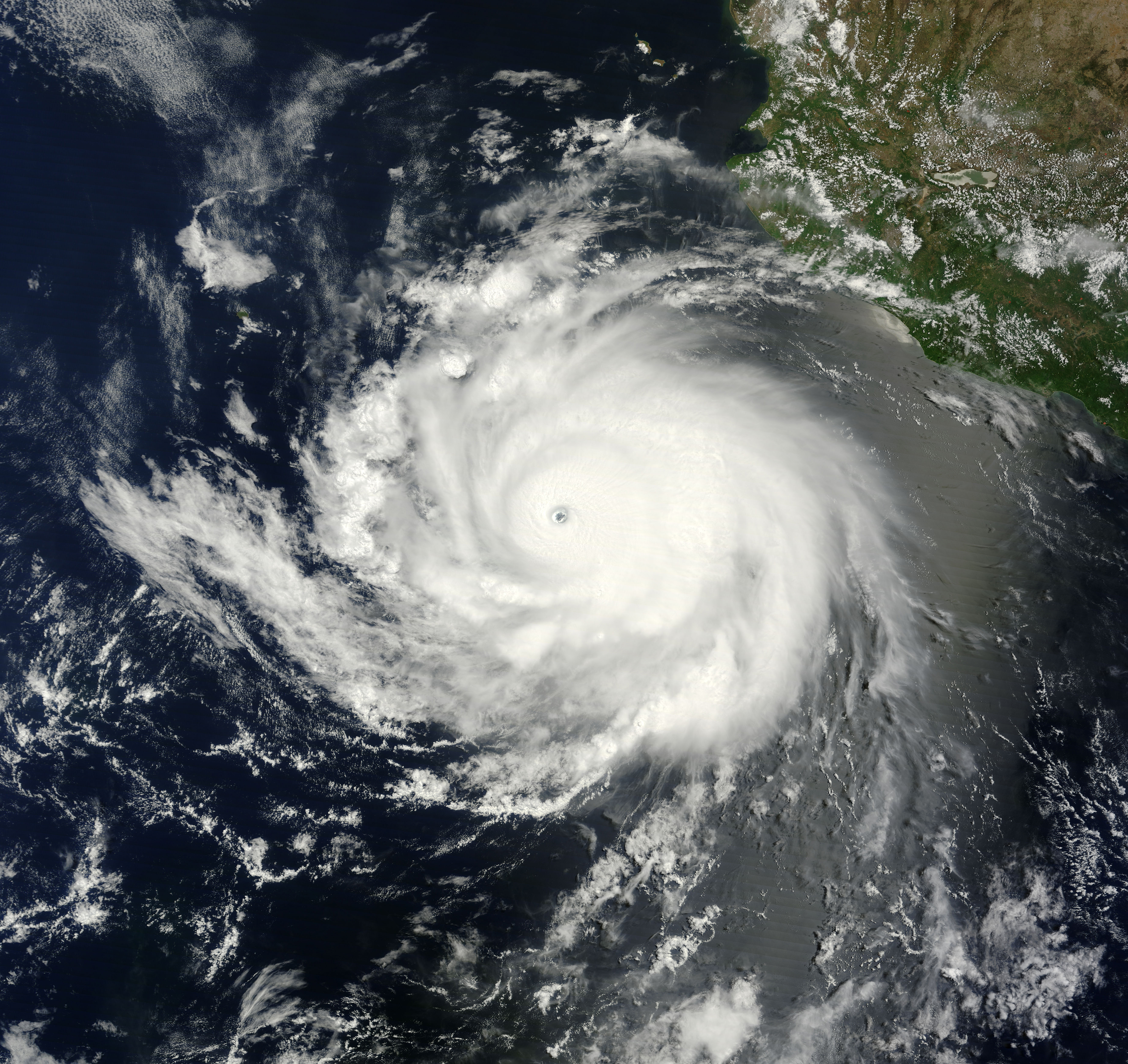
Satellite image of Hurricane Cristina shortly after peak intensity on June 12

- 12:00 UTC (5:00 a.m. PDT) at 16.4°N 106.8°W – Hurricane Cristina strengthens to Category 4 intensity about 240 mi (390 km) southwest of Manzanillo, Colima; it simultaneously reaches its peak intensity, with maximum sustained winds of 150 mph (240 km/h) and a minimum barometric pressure of 935 mbar (27.61 inHg).

June 13

- 00:00 UTC (5:00 p.m. PDT, June 12) at 17.0°N 108.1°W – Hurricane Cristina weakens to Category 3 intensity about 290 mi (465 km) west-southwest of Manzanillo, Colima.
- 06:00 UTC (11:00 p.m. PDT, June 12) at 17.4°N 108.8°W – Hurricane Cristina weakens to Category 2 intensity about 315 mi (510 km) west-southwest of Manzanillo, Colima.
- 18:00 UTC (11:00 a.m. PDT) at 18.3°N 110.1°W – Hurricane Cristina weakens to Category 1 intensity about 380 mi (610 km) west of Manzanillo, Colima.

June 14

- 12:00 UTC (5:00 a.m. PDT) at 19.3°N 111.2°W – Hurricane Cristina weakens into a tropical storm about 260 mi (415 km) south-southwest of Cabo San Lucas, Baja California Sur.

June 15

- 06:00 UTC (11:00 p.m. PDT, June 14) at 19.9°N 112.5°W – Tropical Storm Cristina degenerates into a post-tropical cyclone about 265 mi (425 km) southwest of Cabo San Lucas, Baja California Sur.

June 28

- 18:00 UTC (11:00 a.m. PDT) at 14.2°N 105.5°W – A tropical depression develops from an area of low pressure approximately 345 mi (555 km) south-southwest of Manzanillo, Colima.

June 30

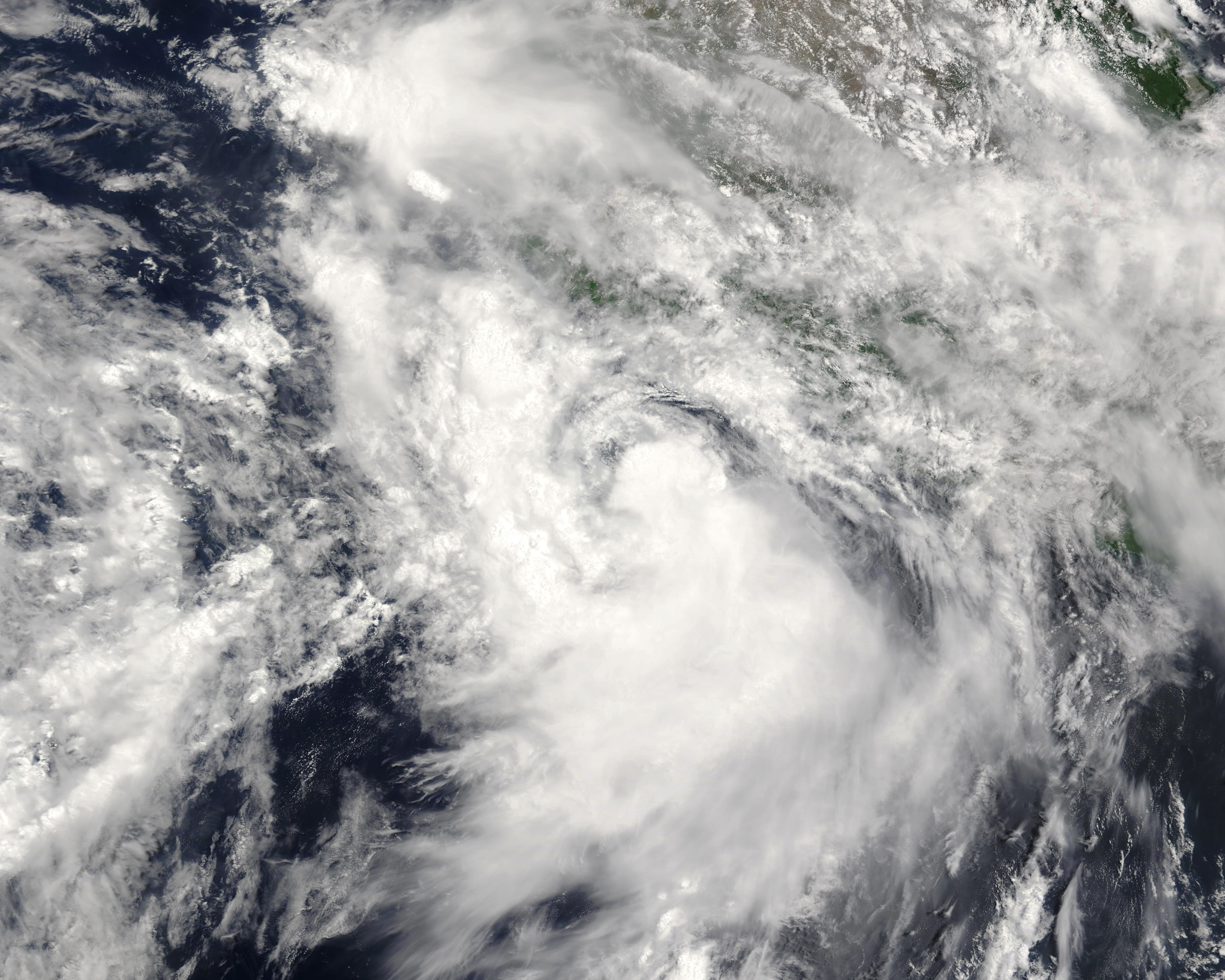
Satellite image of Tropical Storm Elida at peak intensity late on June 30

- 00:00 UTC (5:00 p.m. PDT, June 29) at 16.3°N 112.2°W – The tropical depression strengthens into Tropical Storm Douglas about 550 mi (890 km) west-southwest of Manzanillo, Colima.
- 06:00 UTC (11:00 p.m. PDT, June 29) at 17.0°N 103.0°W – Tropical Storm Elida develops from an area of low pressure about 175 mi (280 km) southeast of Manzanillo, Colima.
- 12:00 UTC (5:00 a.m. PDT) at 17.1°N 103.4°W – Tropical Storm Elida reaches its peak intensity, with maximum sustained winds of 50 mph (85 km/h) and a minimum barometric pressure of 1,002 mbar (29.59 inHg), about 150 mi (240 km) south-southeast of Manzanillo, Colima.

=== July ===
July 1

- 18:00 UTC (11:00 a.m. PDT) at 19.1°N 115.7°W – Tropical Storm Douglas reaches its peak intensity, with maximum sustained winds of 50 mph (85 km/h) and a minimum barometric pressure of 999 mbar (29.50 inHg), about 460 mi (740 km) southwest of Cabo San Lucas, Baja California Sur.

July 2

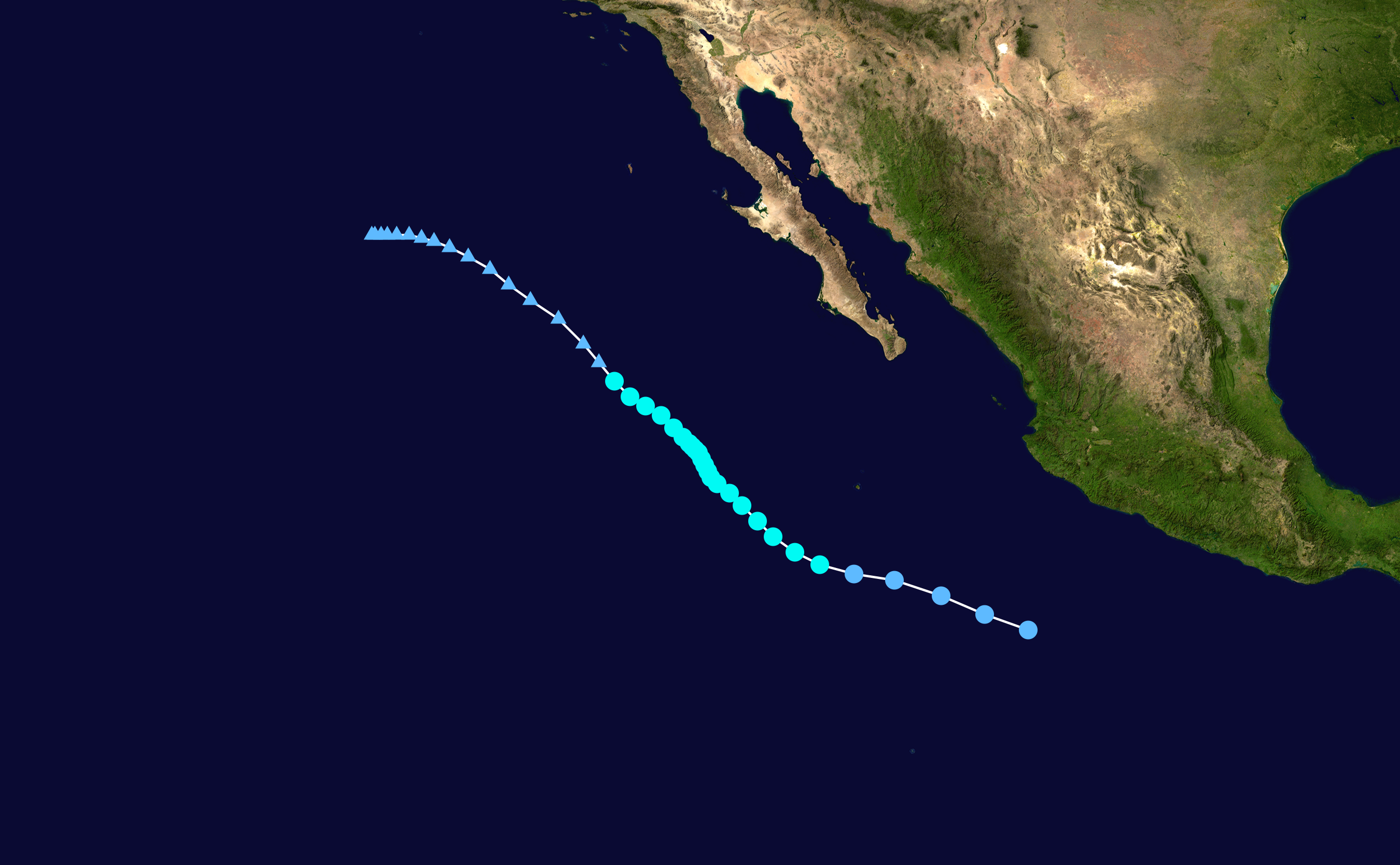
Storm path of Tropical Storm Douglas

- 00:00 UTC (5:00 p.m. PDT, July 1) at 17.1°N 103.6°W – Tropical Storm Elida weakens into a tropical depression about 145 mi (230 km) south-southeast of Manzanillo, Colima.
- 06:00 UTC (11:00 p.m. PDT, July 1) at 17.0°N 103.1°W – Tropical Depression Elida degenerates into a remnant low about 160 mi (260 km) south-southeast of Manzanillo, Colima.

July 6

- 06:00 UTC (11:00 p.m. PDT, July 5) at 22.8°N 119.3°W – Tropical Storm Douglas weakens below gale force and degenerates into a remnant low about 595 mi (955 km) west of Cabo San Lucas, Baja California Sur.

July 7

- 12:00 UTC (5:00 a.m. PDT) at 9.5°N 118.1°W – A tropical depression develops from an area of low pressure about 1,070 mi (1,725 km) south-southwest of the southern tip of the Baja California peninsula.

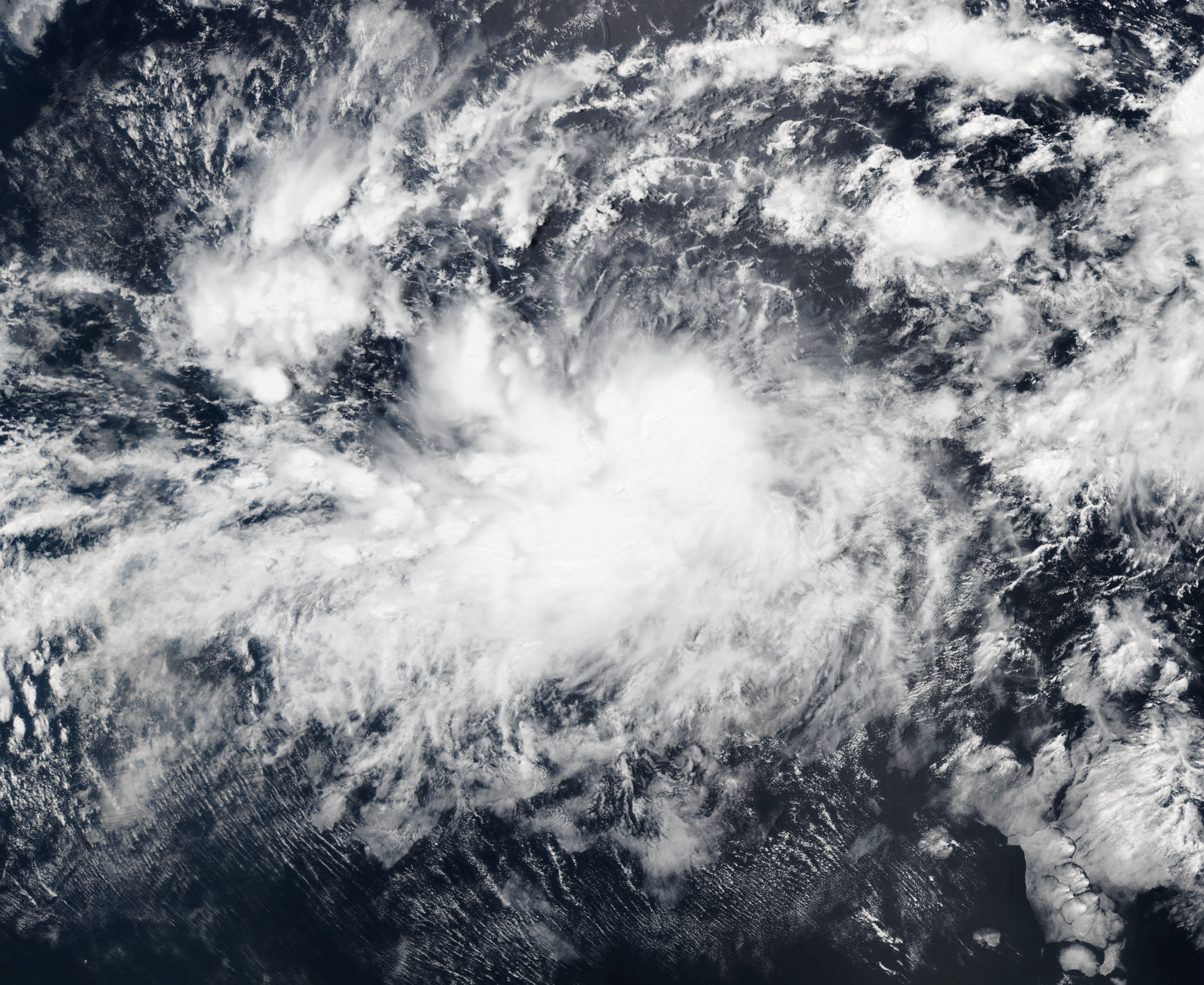
Satellite image of Tropical Storm Fausto on July 8

- 18:00 UTC (11:00 a.m. PDT) at 9.4°N 119.2°W – The tropical depression strengthens into Tropical Storm Fausto about 1,110 mi (1,790 km) southwest of the southern tip of the Baja California peninsula; it simultaneously reaches its peak intensity, with maximum sustained winds of 45 mph (75 km/h) and a minimum barometric pressure of 1,004 mbar (29.65 inHg).

July 9

- 00:00 UTC (5:00 p.m. PDT, July 8) at 10.6°N 125.5°W – Tropical Storm Fausto weakens into a tropical depression about 1,330 mi (2,140 km) southwest of the southern tip of the Baja California peninsula.
- 06:00 UTC (11:00 p.m. PDT, July 8) at 11.3°N 127.0°W – Tropical Depression Fausto is last noted as a tropical cyclone about 1,375 mi (2,215 km) southwest of the southern tip of the Baja California peninsula; it dissipates within the next six hours.

July 17

- 18:00 UTC (8:00 a.m. HST) at 12.4°N 140.4°W – Tropical Storm Wali develops from an area of low pressure. (Note: Operationally, advisories were initiated on Tropical Storm Wali at 21:00 UTC (11:00 a.m. HST) on July 17. Wali was not yet believed to have reached tropical storm strength, and the first advisory designated the storm as Tropical Depression One-C; it was upgraded to Tropical Storm Wali one hour later.)

July 18

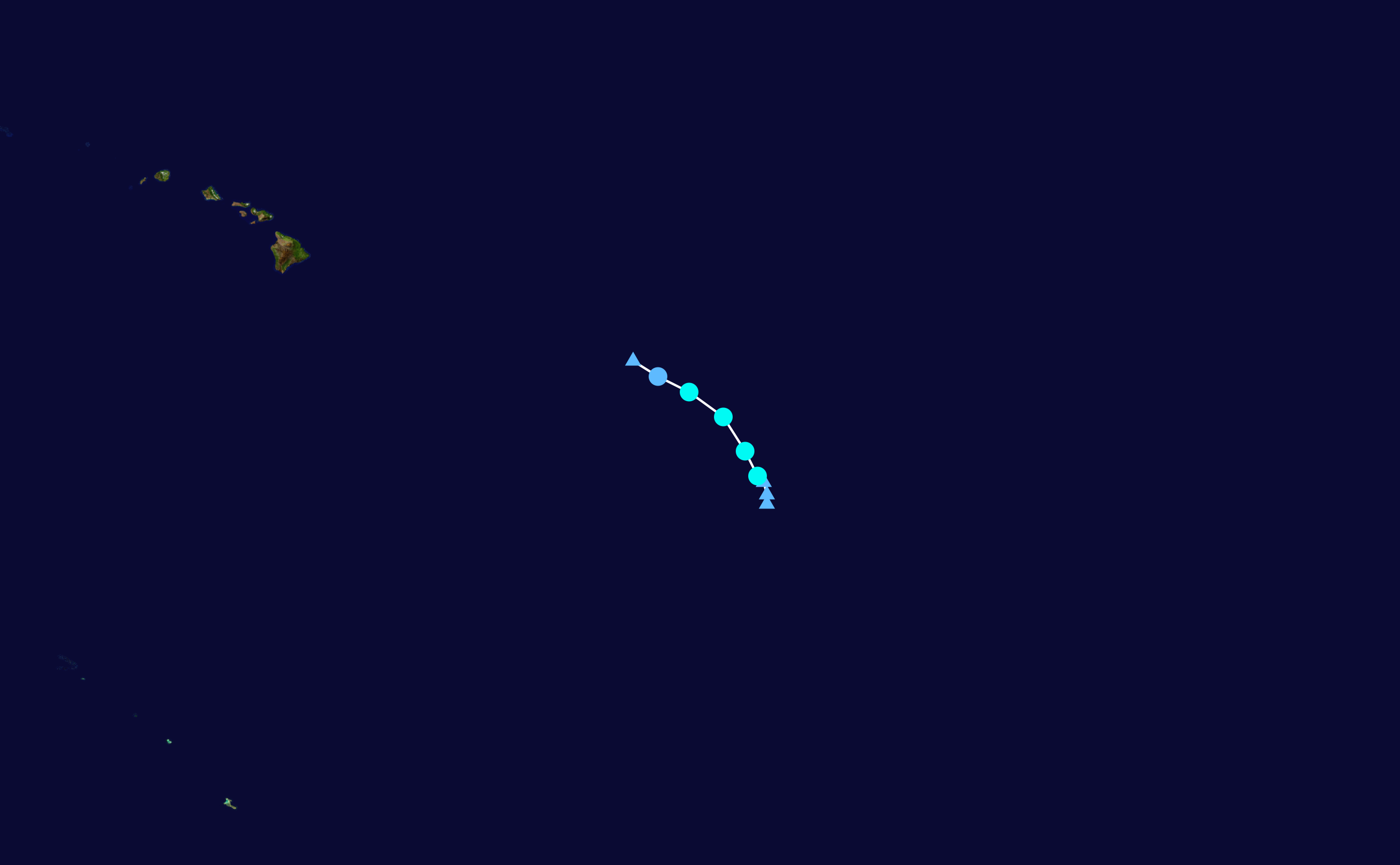
Storm path of Tropical Storm Wali

- 00:00 UTC (2:00 p.m. HST, July 17) at 13.2°N 140.8°W – Tropical Storm Wali reaches its peak intensity, with maximum sustained winds of 45 mph (75 km/h) and a minimum barometric pressure of 1,003 mbar (29.62 inHg).
- 18:00 UTC (8:00 a.m. HST) at 15.6°N 143.6°W – Tropical Storm Wali weakens into a tropical depression.

July 19

- 00:00 UTC (2:00 p.m. HST, July 18) at 16.1°N 144.4°W – Tropical Depression Wali degenerates into a remnant low.

July 25

- 00:00 UTC (5:00 p.m. PDT, July 24) at 12.2°N 133.1°W – A tropical depression develops from an area of low pressure about 1,690 mi (2,725 km) west-southwest of Cabo San Lucas, Baja California Sur.
- 06:00 UTC (11:00 p.m. PDT, July 24) at 12.2°N 134.0°W – The tropical depression strengthens into Tropical Storm Genevieve about 1,745 mi (2,805 km) west-southwest of Cabo San Lucas, Baja California Sur.
- 12:00 UTC (5:00 a.m. PDT) at 12.2°N 135.0°W – Tropical Storm Genevieve reaches its initial peak intensity, with sustained winds of 45 mph (75 km/h) and a barometric pressure of 1,004 mbar (29.65 inHg), about 1,800 mi (2,900 km) west-southwest of Cabo San Lucas, Baja California Sur.

July 26

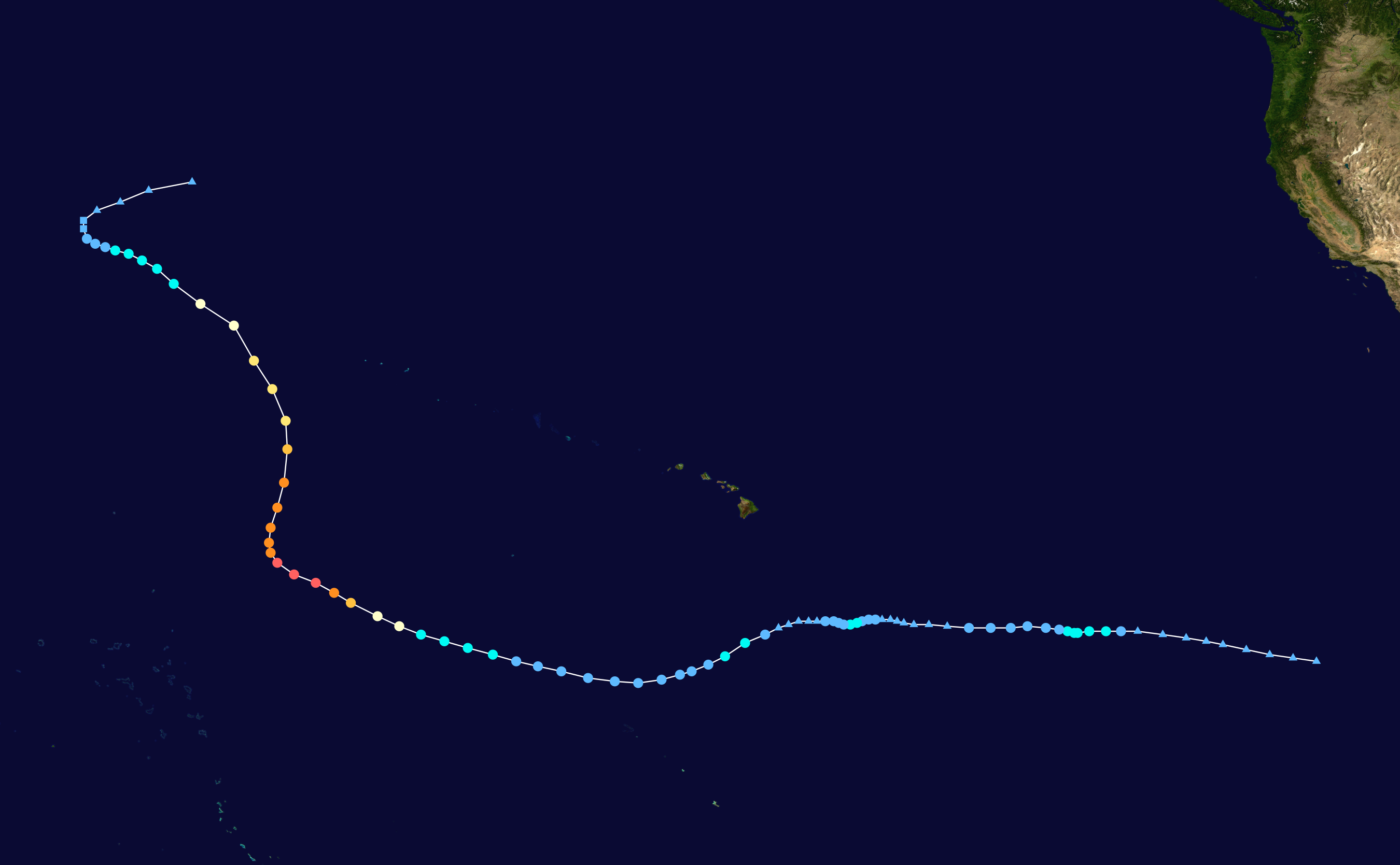
Storm path of Hurricane Genevieve, including the time it spent in the Western Pacific basin as part of the 2014 Pacific typhoon season

- 06:00 UTC (11:00 p.m. PDT, July 25) at 13.3°N 105.6°W – A tropical depression develops from an area of low pressure about 405 mi (650 km) southwest of Zihuatanejo, Guerrero.
- 12:00 UTC (5:00 a.m. PDT) at 12.3°N 136.8°W – Tropical Storm Genevieve weakens into a tropical depression about 1,905 mi (3,065 km) west-southwest of Cabo San Lucas, Baja California Sur.
- 18:00 UTC (11:00 a.m. PDT) at 15.1°N 107.6°W – The aforementioned tropical depression strengthens into Tropical Storm Hernan about 345 mi (555 km) southwest of Manzanillo, Colima.

July 27

- 12:00 UTC (2:00 a.m. HST) at 12.4°N 140.9°W – Tropical Depression Genevieve crosses 140°W, leaving the jurisdiction of the National Hurricane Center (NHC) and entering the area monitored by the Central Pacific Hurricane Center (CPHC).
- 18:00 UTC (11:00 a.m. PDT) at 18.3°N 111.7°W – Tropical Storm Hernan strengthens into a Category 1 hurricane about 335 mi (535 km) south-southwest of the southern tip of the Baja California peninsula; it simultaneously reaches its peak intensity, with maximum sustained winds of 75 mph (120 km/h) and a minimum barometric pressure of 992 mbar (29.29 inHg).

July 28

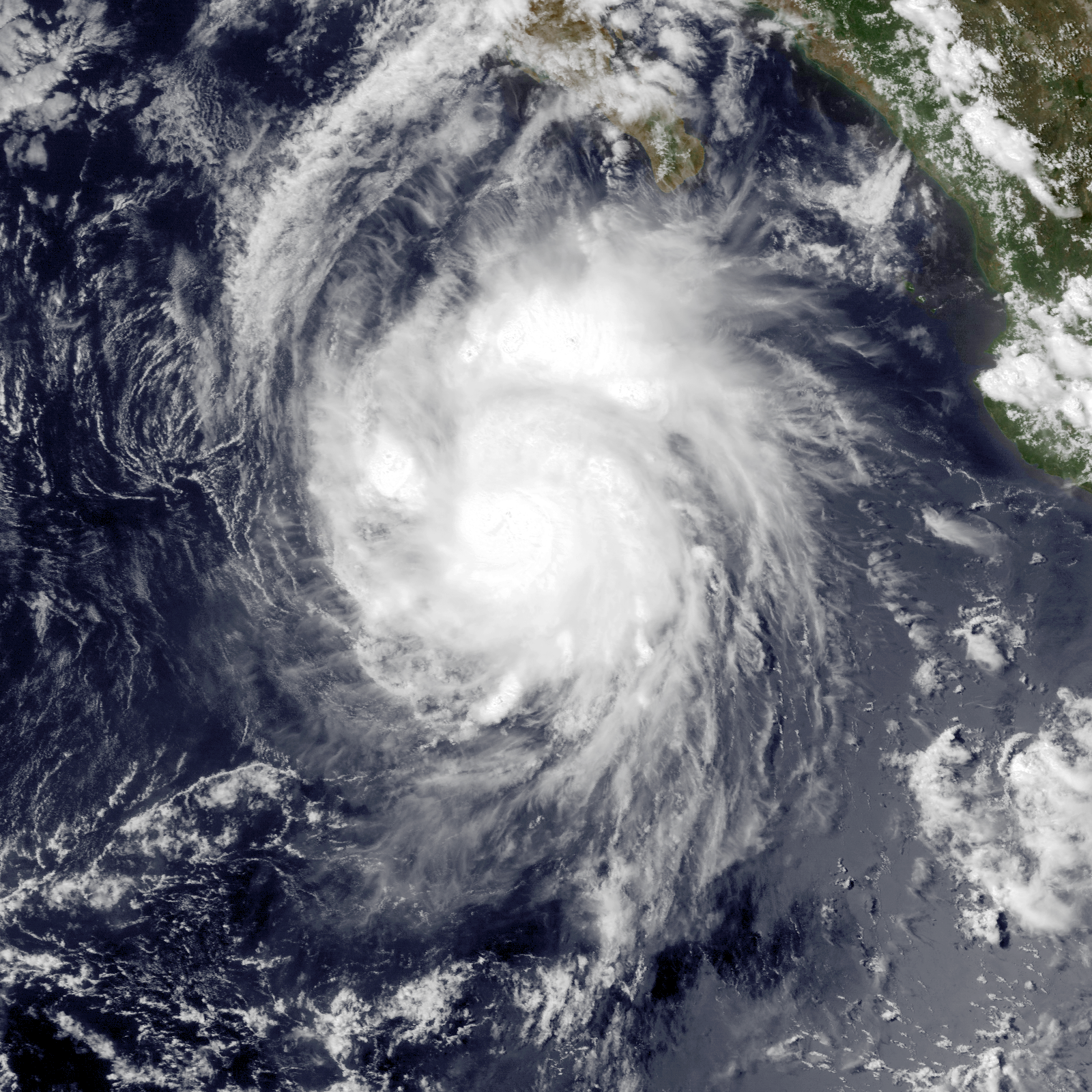
Satellite image of Hurricane Hernan near peak intensity late on July 27

- 00:00 UTC (2:00 p.m. HST, July 27) at 12.5°N 143.5°W – Tropical Depression Genevieve degenerates to a remnant low about 2,315 mi (3,725 km) west-southwest of Cabo San Lucas, Baja California Sur.
- 06:00 UTC (11:00 p.m. PDT, July 27) at 19.6°N 114.0°W – Hurricane Hernan weakens into a tropical storm about 345 mi (555 km) southwest of the southern tip of the Baja California peninsula.

July 29

- 12:00 UTC (5:00 a.m. PDT) at 23.2°N 120.4°W – Tropical Storm Hernan weakens below gale force and degenerates into a remnant low about 660 mi (1,065 km) west of the southern tip of the Baja California peninsula.
- 18:00 UTC (8:00 a.m. HST) at 12.9°N 147.8°W – The remnants of Genevieve regenerate into a tropical depression about 2,570 mi (4,140 km) west-southwest of Cabo San Lucas, Baja California Sur.

July 30

- 12:00 UTC (2:00 a.m. HST) at 12.7°N 148.9°W – Tropical Depression Genevieve restrengthens into a tropical storm about 2,645 mi (4,260 km) west-southwest of Cabo San Lucas, Baja California Sur.

July 31

- 00:00 UTC (2:00 p.m. HST, July 30) at 12.6°N 149.7°W – Tropical Storm Genevieve weakens back into a tropical depression about 2,700 mi (4,345 km) west-southwest of Cabo San Lucas, Baja California Sur.
- 12:00 UTC (5:00 a.m. PDT) at 12.4°N 121.8°W – A tropical depression develops from an area of low pressure about 1,065 mi (1,715 km) southwest of the southern tip of the Baja California peninsula.
- 18:00 UTC (11:00 a.m. PDT) at 12.8°N 122.5°W – The tropical depression strengthens into Tropical Storm Iselle about 1,075 mi (1,735 km) southwest of the southern tip of the Baja California peninsula.

=== August ===
August 1

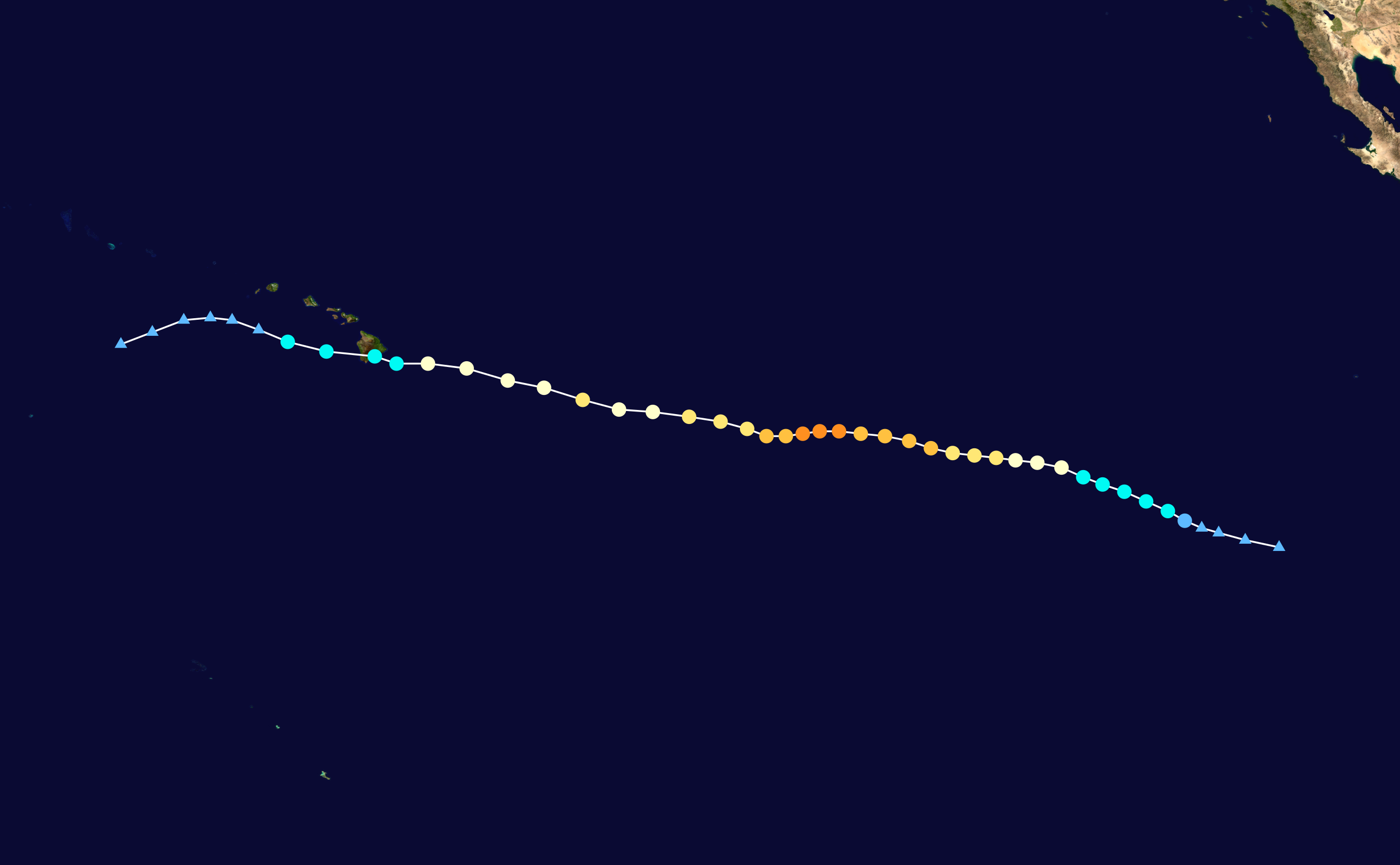
Storm path of Hurricane Iselle

- 00:00 UTC (2:00 p.m. HST, July 31) at 12.8°N 151.3°W – Tropical Depression Genevieve degenerates into an area of unsettled weather about 750 mi (1,205 km) southeast of Hawaii.

August 2

- 00:00 UTC (5:00 p.m. PDT, August 1) at 14.6°N 126.9°W – Tropical Storm Iselle strengthens into a Category 1 hurricane about 1,245 mi (2,000 km) west-southwest of the southern tip of the Baja California peninsula.
- 06:00 UTC (8:00 p.m. HST, August 1) at 12.0°N 154.4°W – The remnants of Genevieve regenerate into a tropical depression for a second time about 695 mi (1,120 km) south-southeast of Hawaii.
- 12:00 UTC (2:00 a.m. HST) at 11.5°N 155.6°W – Tropical Depression Genevieve restrengthens into a tropical storm for a second time about 710 mi (1,140 km) south-southeast of Hawaii.
- 18:00 UTC (11:00 a.m. PDT) at 15.0°N 129.6°W – Hurricane Iselle strengthens to Category 2 intensity about 1,395 mi (2,240 km) west-southwest of the southern tip of the Baja California peninsula.

August 3

- 00:00 UTC (2:00 p.m. HST, August 2) at 10.2°N 157.8°W – Tropical Storm Genevieve weakens back into a tropical depression for a second time about 785 mi (1,260 km) south of Hawaii.
- 12:00 UTC (5:00 a.m. PDT) at 15.4°N 132.3°W – Hurricane Iselle strengthens to Category 3 intensity about 1,540 mi (2,485 km) west-southwest of the southern tip of the Baja California peninsula; this makes it the third major hurricane of the season.

August 4

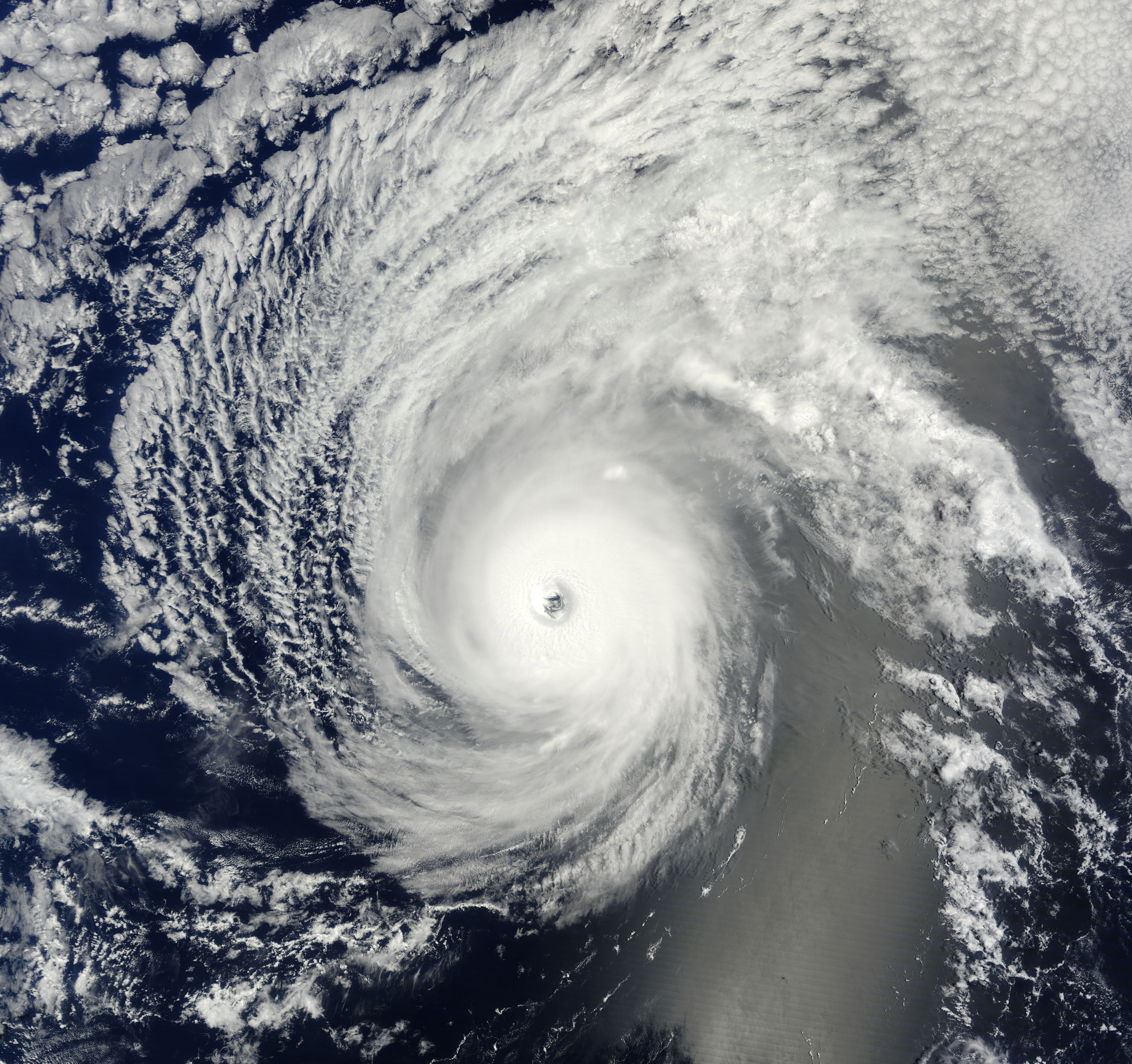
Satellite image of Hurricane Iselle at peak intensity late on August 4

- 00:00 UTC (5:00 p.m. PDT, August 3) at 13.5°N 116.6°W – A tropical depression develops from an area of low pressure about 785 mi (1,260 km) south-southwest of the southern tip of Baja California Sur.
- 06:00 UTC (11:00 p.m. PDT, August 3) at 13.5°N 117.7°W – The tropical depression strengthens into Tropical Storm Julio about 825 mi (1,325 km) southwest of the southern tip of Baja California Sur.
- 12:00 UTC (5:00 a.m. PDT) at 16.1°N 136.1°W – Hurricane Iselle strengthens to Category 4 intensity about 1,760 mi (2,835 km) west-southwest of the southern tip of the Baja California peninsula.
- 18:00 UTC (11:00 a.m. PDT) at 16.1°N 136.9°W – Hurricane Iselle reaches its peak intensity, with maximum sustained winds of 140 mph (220 km/h) and a minimum barometric pressure of 947 mbar (27.96 inHg), about 1,815 mi (2,920 km) west-southwest of the southern tip of the Baja California peninsula.

August 5

- 06:00 UTC (11:00 p.m. PDT, August 4) at 15.9°N 138.3°W – Hurricane Iselle weakens to Category 3 intensity about 1,905 mi (3,065 km) west-southwest of the southern tip of the Baja California peninsula.
- 12:00 UTC (2:00 a.m. HST) at 10.8°N 170.7°W – Tropical Depression Genevieve restrengthens into a tropical storm for a third time about 1,120 mi (1,805 km) southwest of Hawaii.
- 18:00 UTC (11:00 a.m. PDT) at 16.2°N 139.9°W – Hurricane Iselle weakens to Category 2 intensity about 1,995 mi (3,215 km) west-southwest of the southern tip of the Baja California peninsula.

August 6

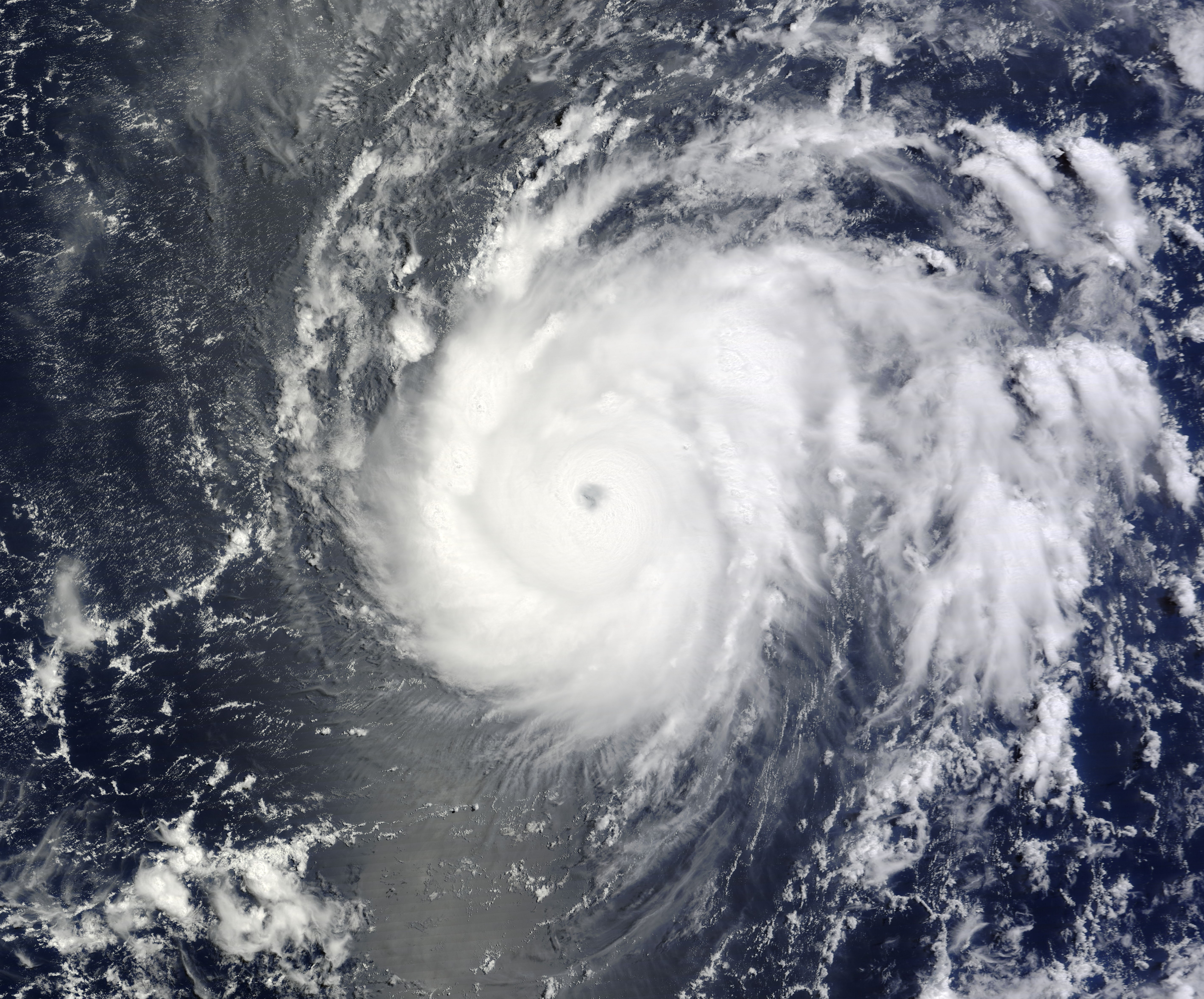
Satellite image of Hurricane Genevieve undergoing rapid intensification late on August 6

- 00:00 UTC (2:00 p.m. HST, August 5) at 16.5°N 141.0°W – Hurricane Iselle crosses 140°W, leaving the NHC's area of responsibility and entering the area monitored by the CPHC.
- 06:00 UTC (11:00 p.m. PDT, August 5) at 14.7°N 128.2°W – Tropical Storm Julio strengthens into a Category 1 hurricane about 1,320 mi (2,120 km) west-southwest of the southern tip of Baja California Sur.
- 12:00 UTC (2:00 a.m. HST) at 12.5°N 176.3°W – Tropical Storm Genevieve strengthens into a Category 1 hurricane about 1,360 mi (2,185 km) west-southwest of Hawaii.
- 12:00 UTC (2:00 a.m. HST) at 16.9°N 143.8°W – Hurricane Iselle weakens to Category 1 intensity about 740 mi (1,195 km) east-southeast of Cape Kumukahi Light.

August 7

- 00:00 UTC (2:00 p.m. HST, August 6) at 13.9°N 179.2°W – Hurricane Genevieve rapidly strengthens to Category 3 intensity, skipping Category 2 status, about 1,490 mi (2,400 km) west-southwest of Hawaii; this makes it the fourth major hurricane of the season. It simultaneously reaches its peak intensity while in the basin, with sustained winds of 115 mph (185 km/h) and a barometric pressure of 965 mbar (28.50 inHg).
- 00:00 UTC (2:00 p.m. HST, August 6) at 17.4°N 146.7°W – Hurricane Iselle restrengthens to Category 2 intensity about 550 mi (890 km) east-southeast of Cape Kumukahi Light; it simultaneously reaches its secondary peak intensity, with sustained winds of 100 mph (155 km/h) and a barometric pressure of 980 mbar (28.94 inHg).
- 06:00 UTC (8:00 p.m. HST, August 6) at 14.4°N 180.0°E – The Japan Meteorological Agency, which is the Regional Specialized Meteorological Centre for the Western Pacific basin, assesses that Hurricane Genevieve has crossed the International Date Line and entered their area of responsibility; the agency designates Genevieve as a typhoon with ten-minute sustained winds of 115 mph (185 km/h) and a barometric pressure of 925 mbar (27.32 inHg).
- 06:00 UTC (8:00 p.m. HST, August 6) at 14.5°N 179.8°E – The CPHC and the Joint Typhoon Warning Center assess that Hurricane Genevieve has crossed the International Date Line, entered the Western Pacific basin, and become part of the 2014 Pacific typhoon season; they redesignate Genevieve as a super typhoon with one-minute sustained winds of 150 mph (240 km/h) and a barometric pressure of 926 mbar (27.34 inHg).
- 06:00 UTC (8:00 p.m. HST, August 6) at 17.9°N 148.3°W – Hurricane Iselle weakens back to Category 1 intensity about 435 mi (705 km) east-southeast of Cape Kumukahi Light.

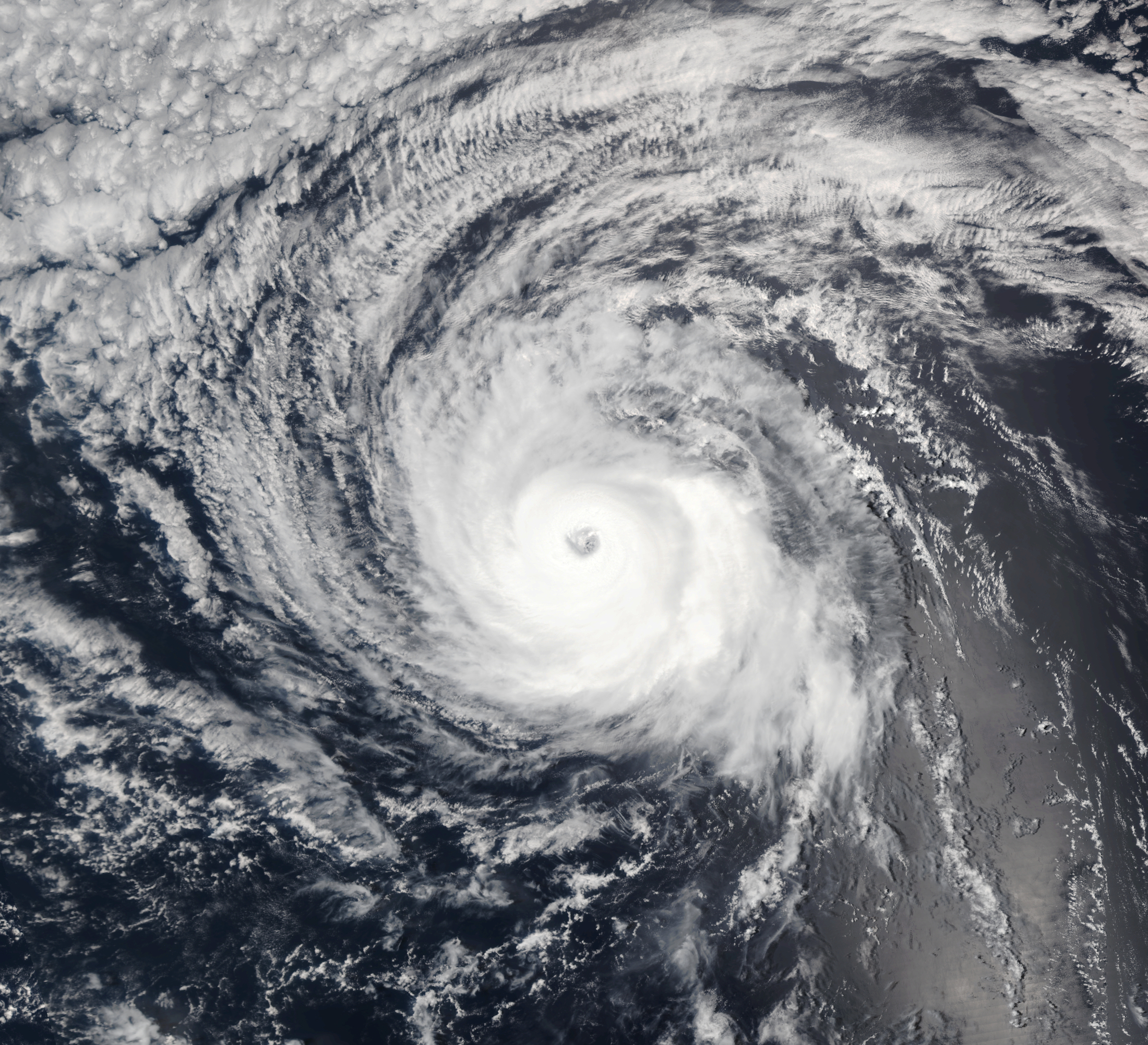
Satellite image of a strengthening Hurricane Julio on August 7

- 06:00 UTC (11:00 p.m. PDT, August 6) at 16.6°N 134.1°W – Hurricane Julio strengthens to Category 2 intensity about 1,625 mi (2,615 km) west-southwest of the southern tip of Baja California Sur.

August 8

- 00:00 UTC (5:00 p.m. PDT, August 7) at 17.3°N 138.4°W – Hurricane Julio strengthens to Category 3 intensity about 1,880 mi (3,030 km) west-southwest of the southern tip of Baja California Sur, making it the fifth major hurricane of the season.
- 06:00 UTC (8:00 p.m. HST, August 7) at 18.9°N 154.4°W – Hurricane Iselle weakens into a tropical storm about 50 mi (85 km) south-southeast of Cape Kumukahi Light.
- 06:00 UTC (11:00 p.m. PDT, August 7) at 17.6°N 139.8°W – Hurricane Julio reaches its peak intensity, with maximum sustained winds of 120 mph (195 km/h) and a minimum barometric pressure of 960 mbar (28.35 inHg), about 1,960 mi (3,160 km) west of the southern tip of Baja California Sur.
- 12:00 UTC (2:00 p.m. HST) at 17.9°N 141.2°W – Hurricane Julio crosses 140°W, leaving the NHC's area of responsibility and entering the area monitored by the CPHC.
- 12:30 UTC (2:30 a.m. HST) at 19.2°N 155.4°W – Tropical Storm Iselle makes landfall just east of Pahala, Hawaii, with sustained winds of 60 mph (95 km/h) and a barometric pressure of 1,001 mbar (29.56 inHg).
- 18:00 UTC (8:00 a.m. HST) at 18.3°N 142.6°W – Hurricane Julio weakens to Category 2 intensity about 1,015 mi (1,630 km) east-southeast of Honolulu, Hawaii.

August 9

- 06:00 UTC (8:00 p.m. HST, August 8) at 20.3°N 160.1°W – Tropical Storm Iselle weakens below gale force and degenerates into a remnant low about 115 mi (185 km) south-southwest of Kauai.

August 10

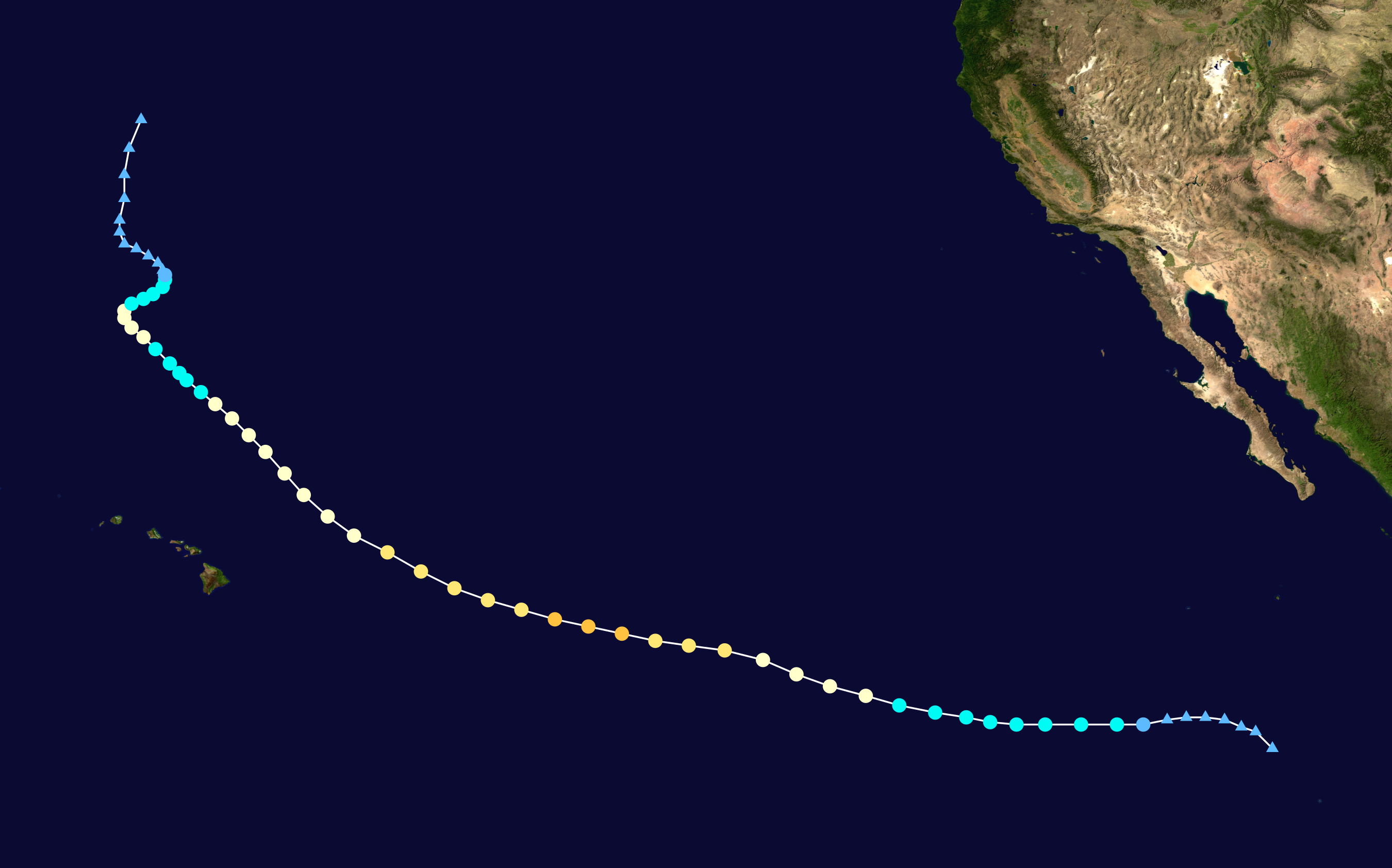
Storm path of Hurricane Julio

- 00:00 UTC (2:00 p.m. HST, August 9) at 21.4°N 149.6°W – Hurricane Julio weakens to Category 1 intensity about 530 mi (850 km) east of Honolulu, Hawaii.

August 12

- 00:00 UTC (2:00 p.m. HST, August 11) at 27.4°N 156.0°W – Hurricane Julio weakens into a tropical storm about 435 mi (705 km) north-northeast of Honolulu, Hawaii.

August 13

- 00:00 UTC (5:00 p.m. PDT, August 12) at 16.4°N 107.8°W – A tropical depression develops from an area of low pressure about 290 mi (465 km) southwest of Manzanillo, Colima.
- 06:00 UTC (8:00 p.m. HST, August 12) at 29.7°N 158.4°W – Tropical Storm Julio restrengthens into a Category 1 hurricane about 580 mi (935 km) north of Honolulu, Hawaii.
- 12:00 UTC (5:00 a.m. PDT) at 17.1°N 110.6°W – The tropical depression intensifies into Tropical Storm Karina about 430 mi (695 km) west-southwest of Manzanillo, Colima.
- 18:00 UTC (8:00 a.m. HST) at 30.5°N 159.2°W – Hurricane Julio reaches its secondary peak intensity, with sustained winds of 80 mph (130 km/h) and a barometric pressure of 983 mbar (29.03 inHg), about 640 mi (1,030 km) north of Honolulu, Hawaii.

August 14

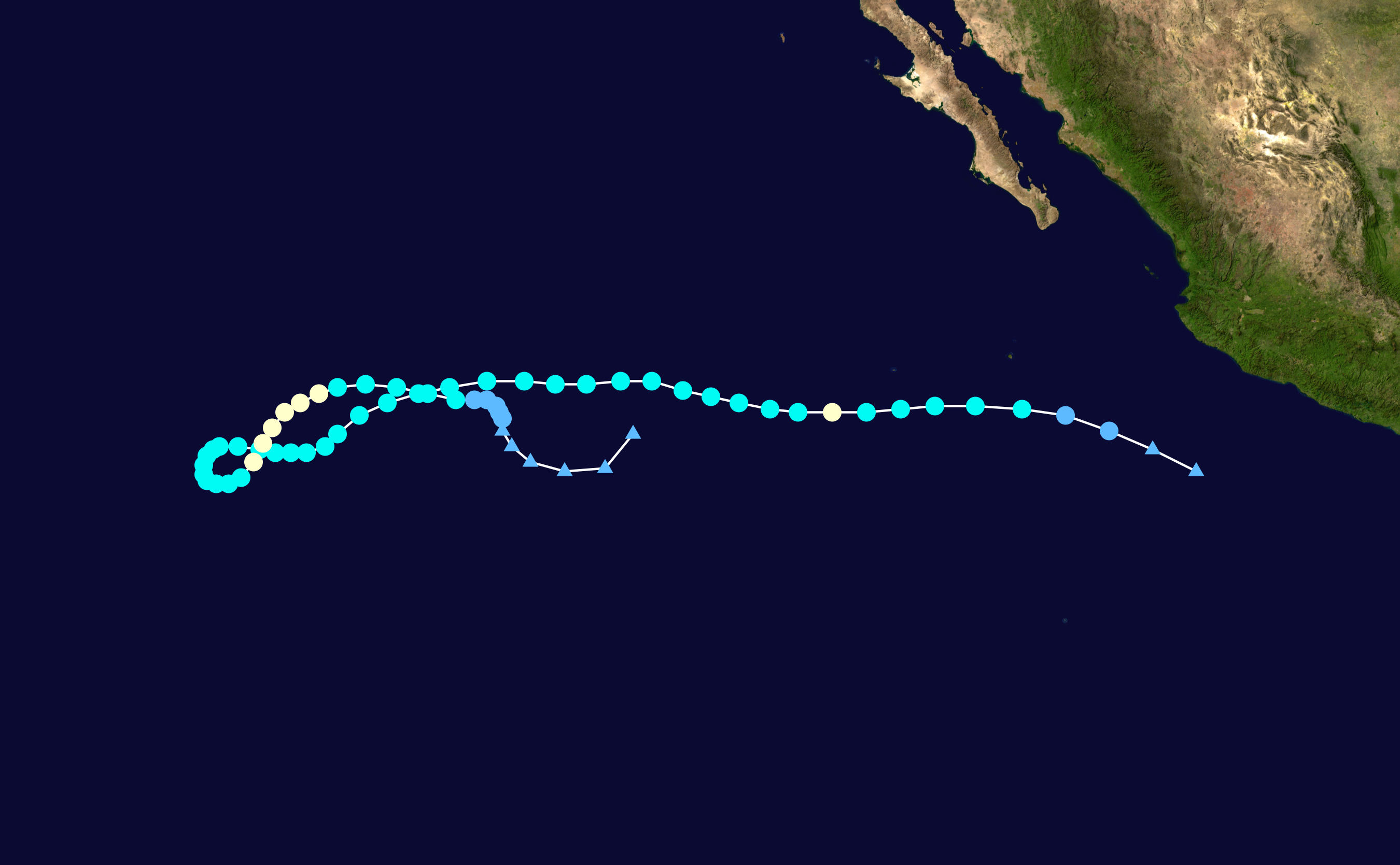
Storm path of Hurricane Karina

- 06:00 UTC (8:00 p.m. HST, August 13) at 31.1°N 158.9°W – Hurricane Julio weakens back into a tropical storm about 680 mi (1,095 km) north of Honolulu, Hawaii.
- 18:00 UTC (11:00 a.m. PDT) at 17.0°N 116.7°W – Tropical Storm Karina strengthens into a Category 1 hurricane about 825 mi (1,325 km) west of Manzanillo, Colima; it simultaneously reaches its initial peak intensity, with sustained winds of 75 mph (120 km/h) and a barometric pressure of 990 mbar (29.23 inHg).

August 15

- 00:00 UTC (5:00 p.m. PDT, August 16) at 17.0°N 117.8°W – Hurricane Karina weakens into a tropical storm about 900 mi (1,445 km) west of Manzanillo, Colima.
- 12:00 UTC (2:00 a.m. HST) at 32.3°N 157.5°W – Tropical Storm Julio weakens into a tropical depression about 760 mi (1,225 km) north of Honolulu, Hawaii.
- 18:00 UTC (8:00 a.m. HST) at 32.5°N 157.6°W – Tropical Depression Julio degenerates into a remnant low about 770 mi (1,240 km) north of Honolulu, Hawaii.

August 17

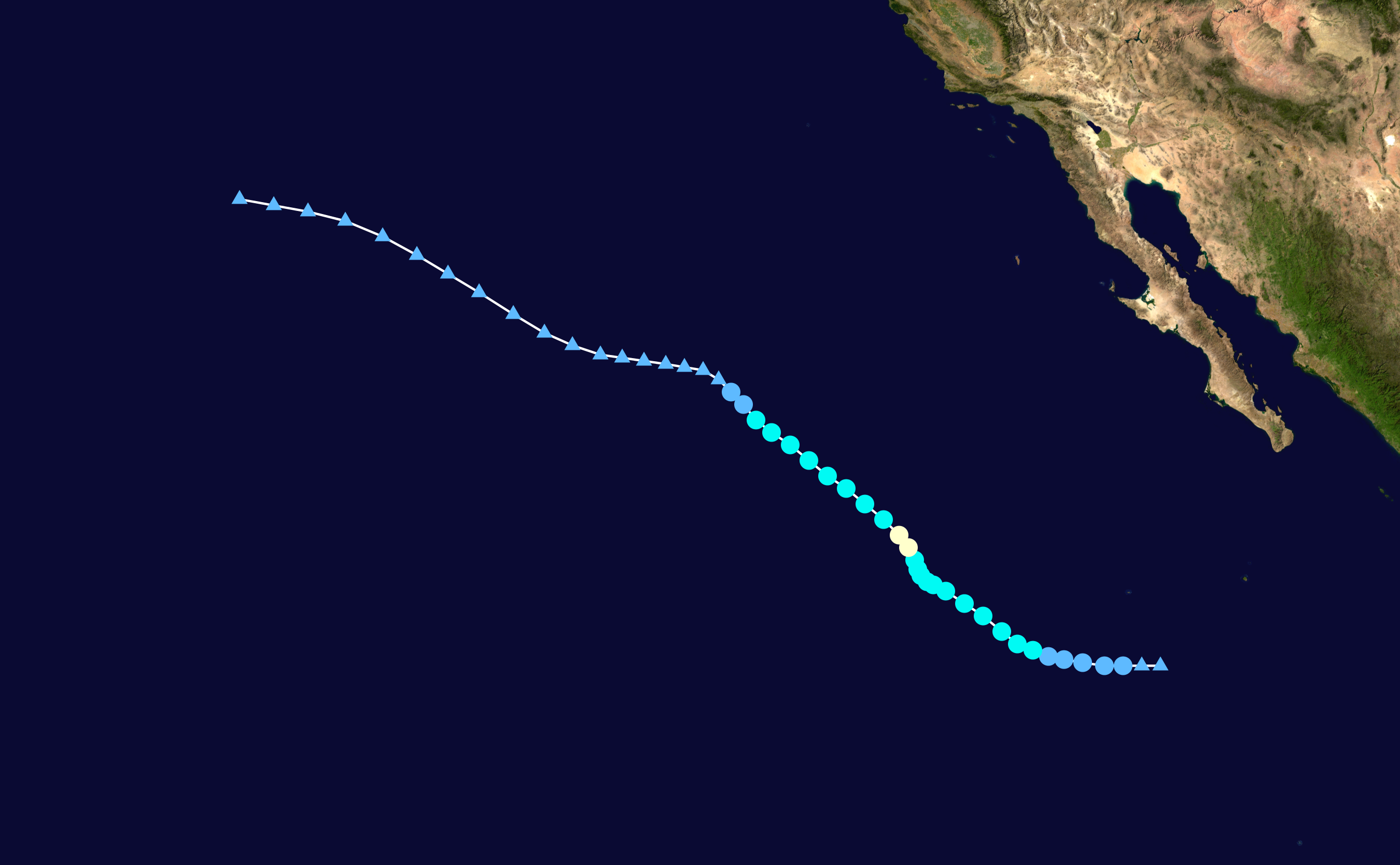
Storm path of Hurricane Lowell

- 12:00 UTC (5:00 a.m. PDT) at 16.0°N 114.9°W – A tropical depression develops from an area of low pressure about 575 mi (925 km) southwest of the southern tip of the Baja California peninsula.

August 18

- 18:00 UTC (11:00 a.m. PDT) at 16.5°N 117.8°W – The tropical depression strengthens into Tropical Storm Lowell about 675 mi (1,085 km) southwest of the southern tip of the Baja California peninsula.

August 21

- 12:00 UTC (5:00 a.m. PDT) at 19.8°N 121.8°W – Tropical Storm Lowell strengthens into a Category 1 hurricane about 790 mi (1,270 km) west-southwest of the southern tip of the Baja California peninsula; it simultaneously reaches maximum sustained winds of 75 mph (120 km/h).
- 18:00 UTC (11:00 a.m. PDT) at 20.2°N 122.1°W – Hurricane Lowell reaches a minimum barometric pressure of 980 mbar (28.94 inHg) about 800 mi (1,290 km) west-southwest of the southern tip of the Baja California peninsula.

August 22

Satellite image of Hurricane Karina (lower left) and Tropical Storm Lowell (upper right) late on August 22

- 00:00 UTC (5:00 p.m. PDT, August 21) at 20.7°N 122.6°W – Hurricane Lowell weakens into a tropical storm about 825 mi (1,325 km) west of the southern tip of the Baja California peninsula.
- 00:00 UTC (5:00 p.m. PDT, August 21) at 12.3°N 98.8°W – A tropical depression develops from an area of low pressure approximately 320 mi (520 km) south-southeast of Acapulco, Guerrero.
- 06:00 UTC (11:00 p.m. PDT, August 21) at 12.6°N 100.3°W – The tropical depression strengthens into Tropical Storm Marie about 295 mi (475 km) south of Acapulco, Guerrero.
- 18:00 UTC (11:00 a.m. PDT) at 15.4°N 135.3°W – Tropical Storm Karina restrengthens into a Category 1 hurricane about 1,725 mi (2,780 km) west-southwest of the southern tip of the Baja California peninsula.

August 23

- 06:00 UTC (11:00 p.m. PDT, August 22) at 16.5°N 134.7°W – Hurricane Karina reaches its peak intensity, with maximum sustained winds of 85 mph (140 km/h) and a minimum barometric pressure of 983 mbar (29.03 inHg), about 1,665 mi (2,680 km) west-southwest of the southern tip of the Baja California peninsula.
- 06:00 UTC (11:00 p.m. PDT, August 22) at 13.9°N 105.1°W – Tropical Storm Marie strengthens into a Category 1 hurricane about 405 mi (650 km) west-southwest of Acapulco, Guerrero.

August 24

- 00:00 UTC (5:00 p.m. PDT, August 23) at 24.4°N 127.1°W – Tropical Storm Lowell weakens into a tropical depression about 1,090 mi (1,750 km) west of the southern tip of the Baja California peninsula.
- 00:00 UTC (5:00 p.m. PDT, August 23) at 15.5°N 108.2°W – Hurricane Marie strengthens to Category 2 intensity about 525 mi (845 km) south-southeast of Cabo San Lucas, Baja California Sur.
- 06:00 UTC (11:00 p.m. PDT, August 23) at 17.8°N 132.6°W – Hurricane Karina weakens into a tropical storm about 1,510 mi (2,430 km) west-southwest of the southern tip of the Baja California peninsula.
- 06:00 UTC (11:00 p.m. PDT, August 23) at 15.9°N 109.4°W – Hurricane Marie rapidly strengthens to Category 4 strength, skipping Category 3 status, about 485 mi (780 km) south of Cabo San Lucas, Baja California Sur; this makes it the sixth major hurricane of the season.
- 12:00 UTC (5:00 a.m. PDT) at 25.2°N 127.9°W – Tropical Depression Lowell degenerates into a remnant low about 810 mi (1,305 km) west-southwest of Punta Eugenia, Baja California Sur.

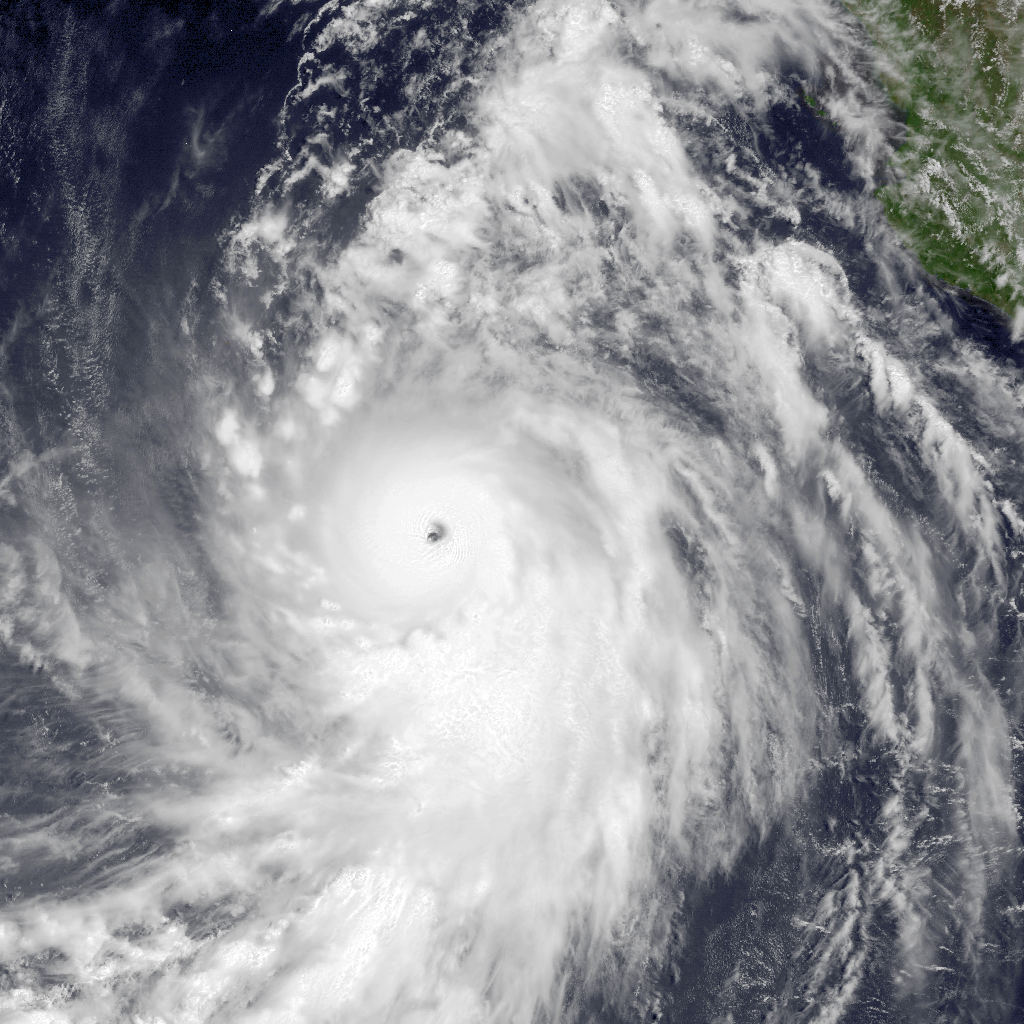
Satellite image of Hurricane Marie at peak intensity on August 24

- 18:00 UTC (11:00 a.m. PDT) at 15.9°N 111.9°W – Hurricane Marie strengthens to Category 5 intensity about 615 mi (990 km) south-southwest of Cabo San Lucas, Baja California Sur. It simultaneously reaches its peak intensity, with maximum sustained winds of 160 mph (260 km/h) and a minimum barometric pressure of 918 mbar (27.11 inHg), making it the strongest storm of the season.

August 25

- 00:00 UTC (5:00 p.m. PDT, August 24) at 16.3°N 112.5°W – Hurricane Marie weakens to Category 4 intensity about 485 mi (780 km) south-southwest of Cabo San Lucas, Baja California Sur.
- 12:00 UTC (5:00 a.m. PDT) at 17.4°N 128.2°W – Tropical Storm Karina weakens into a tropical depression about 1,245 mi (2,000 km) west-southwest of the southern tip of the Baja California peninsula.

August 26

- 00:00 UTC (5:00 p.m. PDT, August 25) at 18.8°N 116.2°W – Hurricane Marie weakens to Category 3 intensity about 490 mi (790 km) southwest of Cabo San Lucas, Baja California Sur.
- 06:00 UTC (11:00 p.m. PDT, August 25) at 19.6°N 117.2°W – Hurricane Marie weakens to Category 2 intensity about 520 mi (835 km) west-southwest of Cabo San Lucas, Baja California Sur.
- 18:00 UTC (11:00 a.m. PDT) at 16.4°N 127.3°W – Tropical Depression Karina degenerates into a remnant low about 1,215 mi (1,955 km) west-southwest of the southern tip of the Baja California peninsula.

August 27

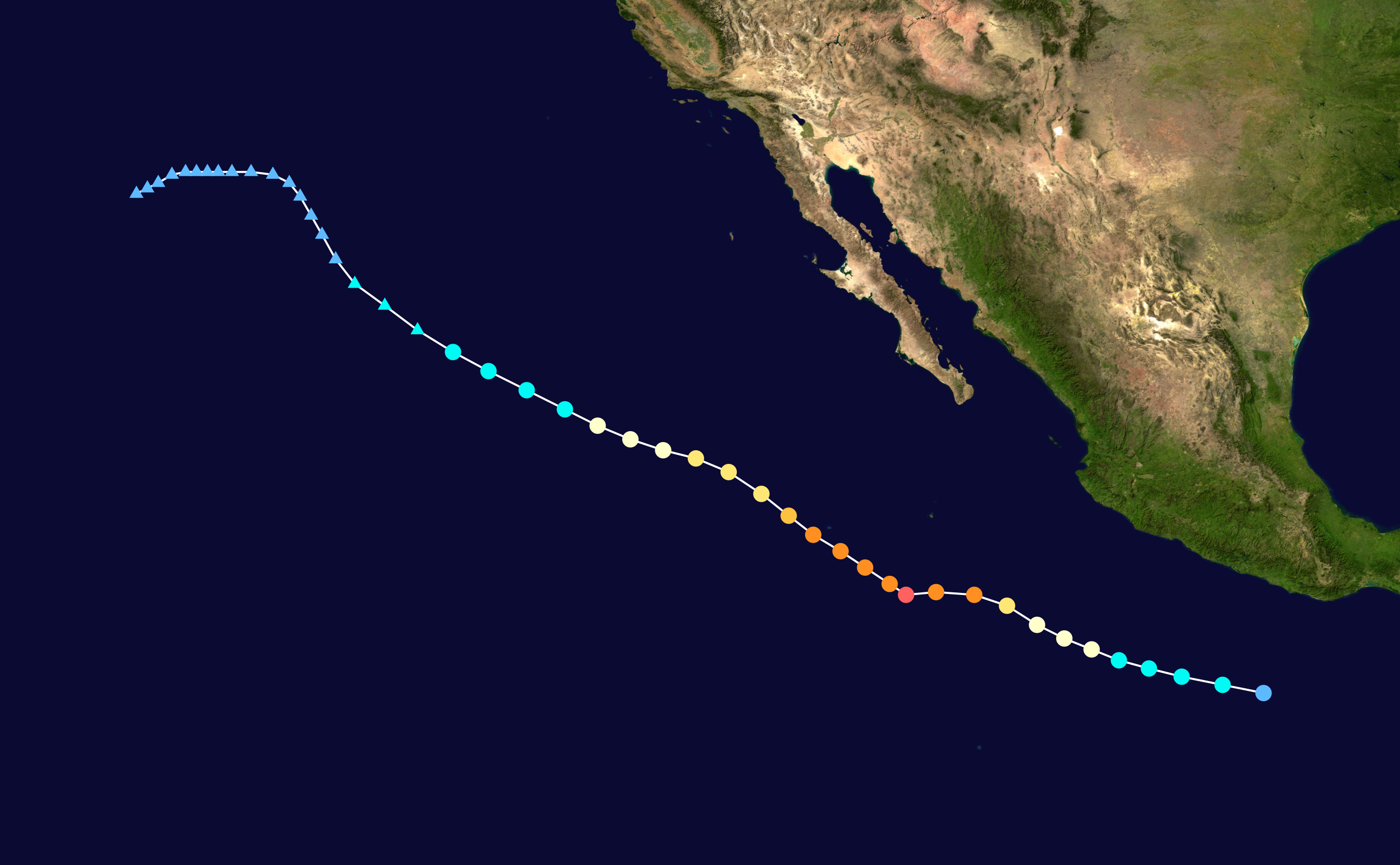
Storm path of Hurricane Marie

- 00:00 UTC (5:00 p.m. PDT, August 26) at 21.2°N 120.8°W – Hurricane Marie weakens to Category 1 intensity about 700 mi (1,130 km) west of Cabo San Lucas, Baja California Sur.
- 18:00 UTC (11:00 a.m. PDT) at 22.7°N 124.4°W – Hurricane Marie weakens into a tropical storm about 920 mi (1,480 km) west of Cabo San Lucas, Baja California Sur.

August 28

- 18:00 UTC (11:00 a.m. PDT) at 25.6°N 129.8°W – Tropical Storm Marie degenerates into a post-tropical cyclone about 1,260 mi (2,030 km) west of Cabo San Lucas, Baja California Sur.

=== September ===
September 2

- 12:00 UTC (5:00 a.m. PDT) at 17.0°N 106.5°W – Tropical Storm Norbert develops from an area of low pressure about 240 mi (390 km) south-southwest of Cabo Corrientes, Jalisco.

September 4

- 00:00 UTC (5:00 p.m. PDT, September 3) at 19.7°N 109.3°W – Tropical Storm Norbert strengthens into a Category 1 hurricane about 240 mi (390 km) west of Cabo Corrientes, Jalisco.

September 6

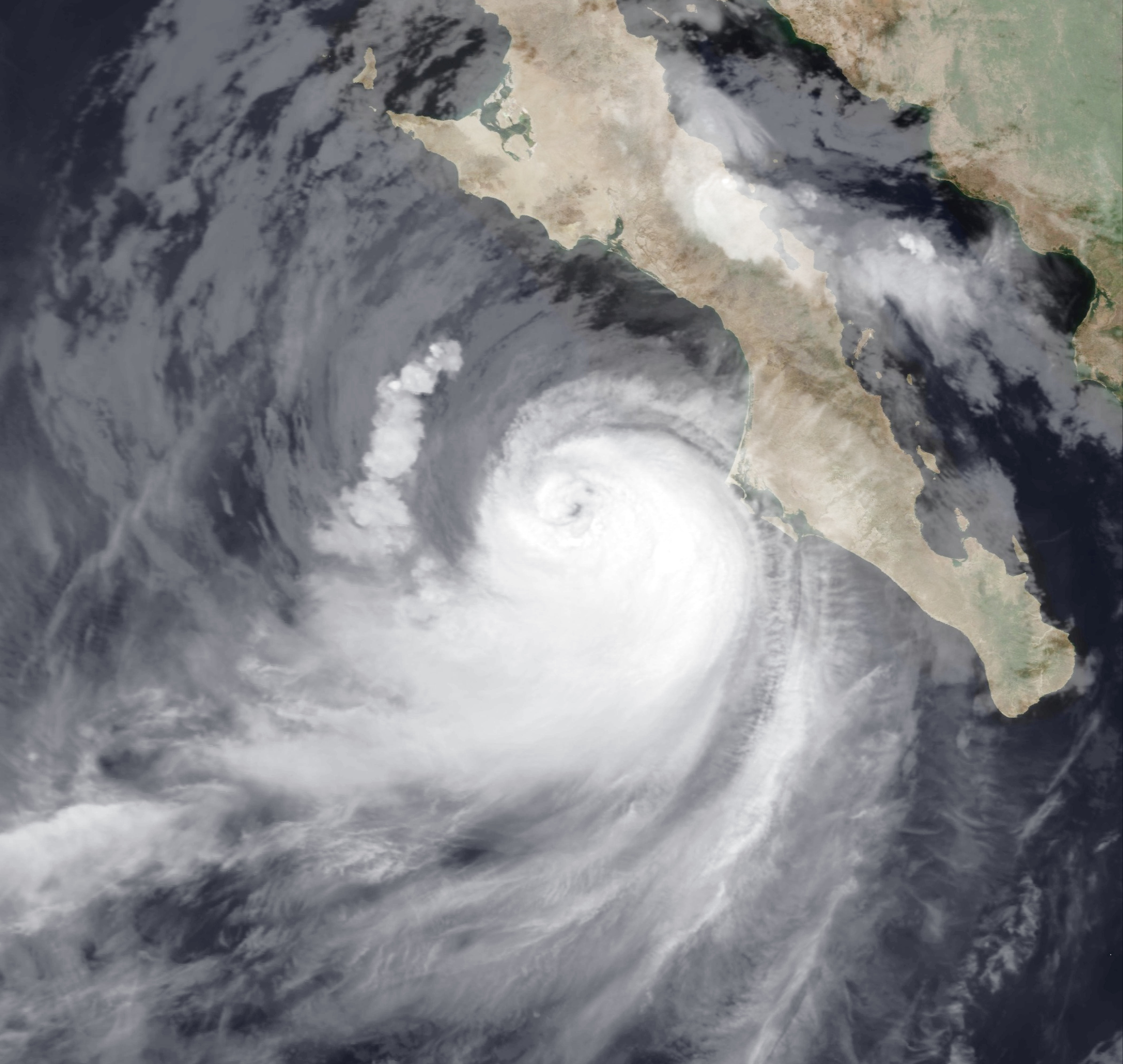
Short-wave infrared satellite image of Hurricane Norbert shortly after peak intensity early on September 6

- 00:00 UTC (5:00 p.m. PDT, September 5) at 24.0°N 112.6°W – Hurricane Norbert strengthens to Category 2 intensity about 60 mi (95 km) south-southwest of Cabo San Lázaro, Baja California Sur.
- 06:00 UTC (11:00 p.m. PDT, September 5) at 24.4°N 113.1°W – Hurricane Norbert strengthens to Category 3 intensity about 60 mi (95 km) west-southwest of Cabo San Lázaro, Baja California Sur, making it the seventh major hurricane of the season; it simultaneously reaches its peak intensity, maximum sustained winds of 125 mph (205 km/h) and a minimum barometric pressure of 950 mbar (28.05 inHg).
- 18:00 UTC (11:00 a.m. PDT) at 25.1°N 114.5°W – Hurricane Norbert weakens to Category 2 intensity about 140 mi (220 km) west of Cabo San Lázaro, Baja California Sur.

September 7

- 00:00 UTC (5:00 p.m. PDT, September 6) at 25.3°N 115.1°W – Hurricane Norbert weakens to Category 1 intensity about 180 mi (285 km) west of Cabo San Lázaro, Baja California Sur.
- 12:00 UTC (5:00 a.m. PDT) at 25.9°N 116.7°W – Hurricane Norbert weakens into a tropical storm about 165 mi (270 km) southwest of Punta Eugenia, Baja California Sur.

September 8

- 00:00 UTC (5:00 p.m. PDT, September 7) at 26.8°N 117.7°W – Tropical Storm Norbert degenerates into a post-tropical cyclone approximately 180 mi (285 km) west-southwest of Punta Eugenia, Baja California Sur.

September 10

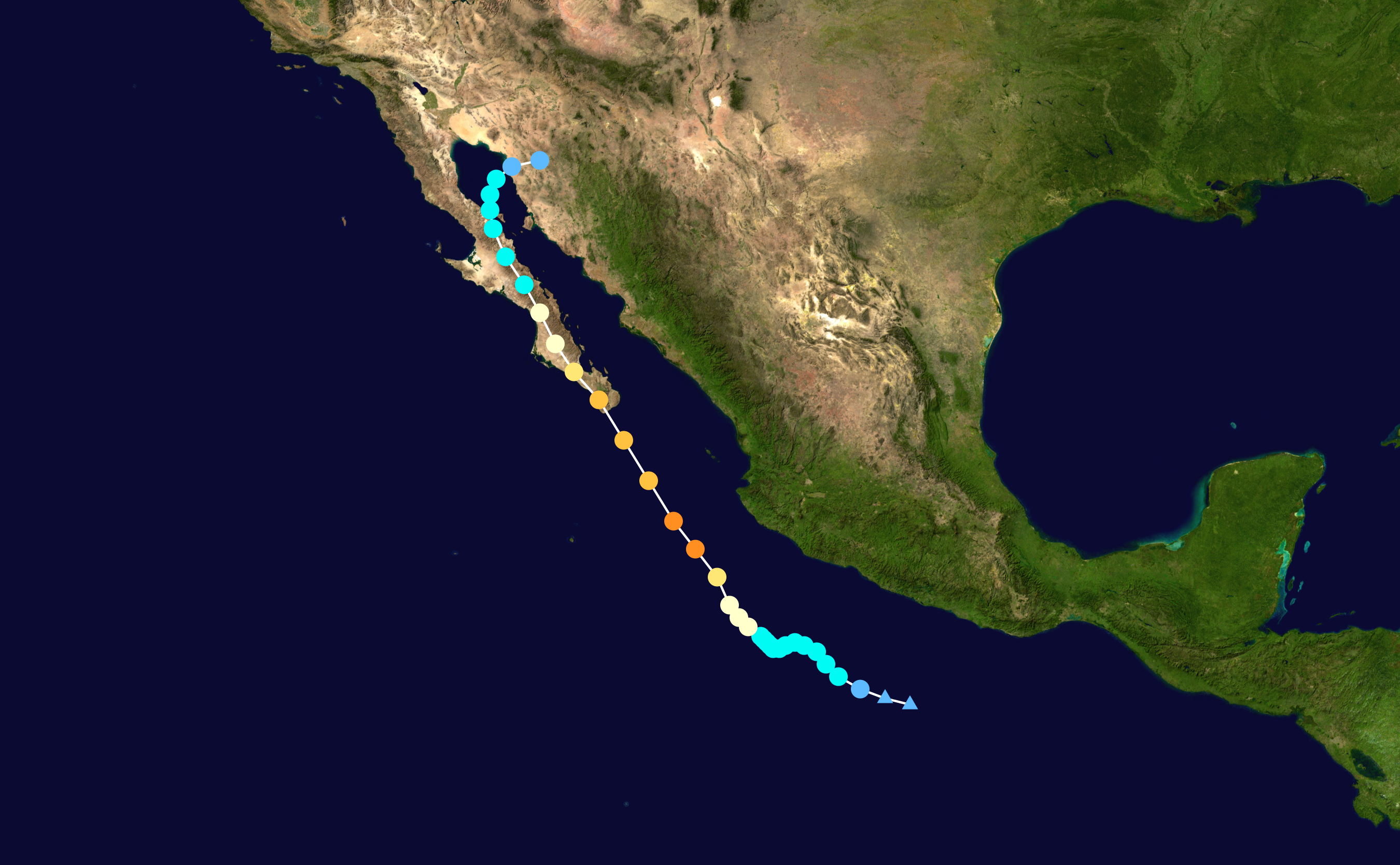
Storm path of Hurricane Odile

- 00:00 UTC (5:00 p.m. PDT, September 9) at 14.0°N 101.7°W – A tropical depression develops from an area of low pressure about 230 mi (370 km) south-southwest of Acapulco, Guerrero.
- 06:00 UTC (11:00 p.m. PDT, September 9) at 14.4°N 102.4°W – The tropical depression strengthens into Tropical Storm Odile about 235 mi (380 km) southwest of Acapulco, Guerrero.

September 11

- 06:00 UTC (11:00 p.m. PDT, September 10) at 14.7°N 119.1°W – Tropical Depression Sixteen-E develops from an area of low pressure about 825 mi (1,325 km) southwest of Cabo San Lucas, Baja California Sur; it simultaneously reaches maximum sustained winds of 35 mph (55 km/h).

September 13

- 06:00 UTC (11:00 p.m. PDT, September 12) at 16.0°N 105.3°W – Tropical Storm Odile strengthens into a Category 1 hurricane about 220 mi (350 km) south-southwest of Manzanillo, Colima.

September 14

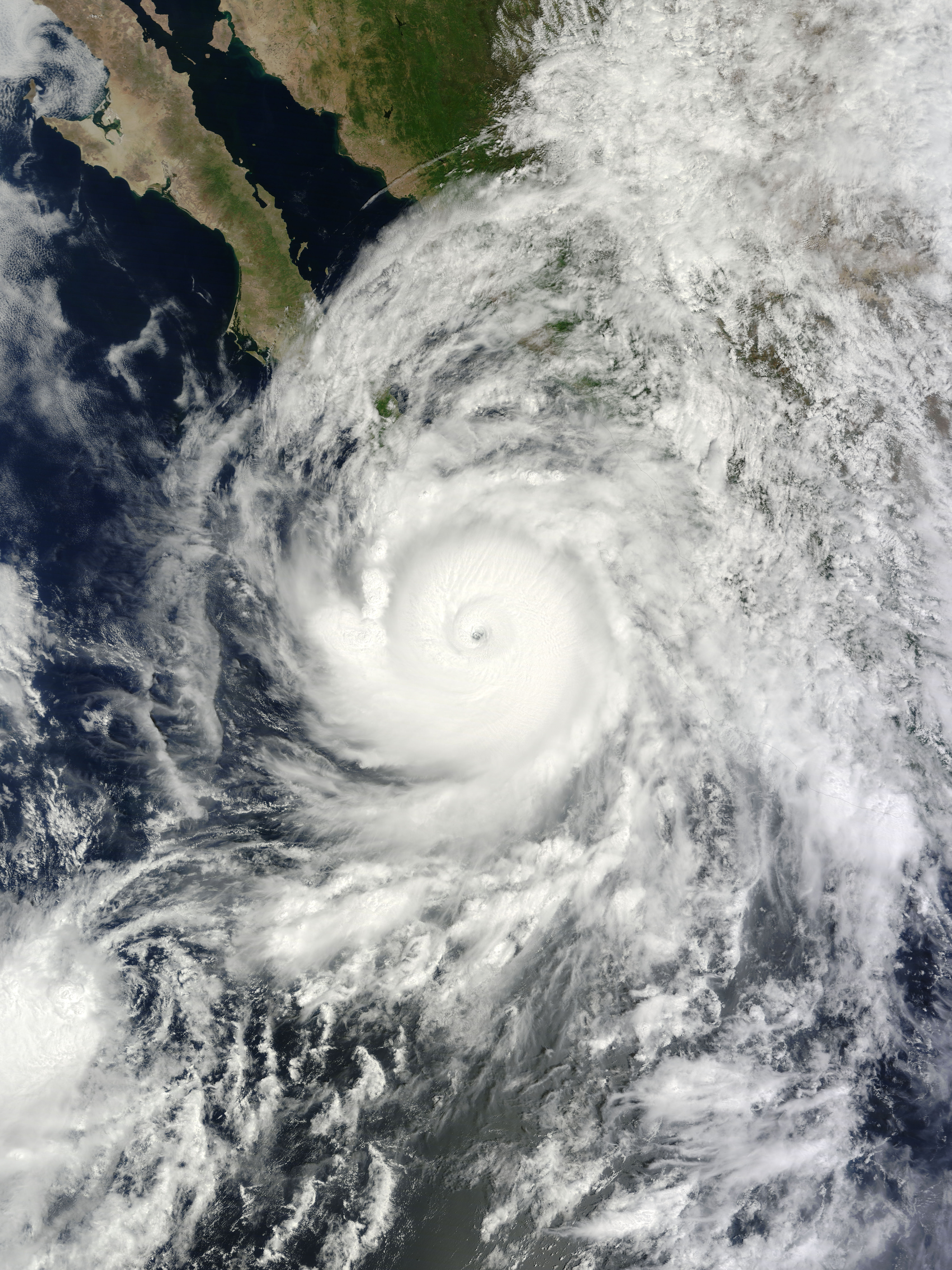
Satellite image of Hurricane Odile undergoing an eyewall replacement cycle on September 14, with Tropical Depression Sixteen-E visible to the southwest

- 00:00 UTC (5:00 p.m. PDT, September 13) at 17.6°N 106.3°W – Hurricane Odile strengthens to Category 2 intensity about 165 mi (270 km) southwest of Manzanillo, Colima.
- 06:00 UTC (11:00 p.m. PDT, September 13) at 18.5°N 107.0°W – Hurricane Odile rapidly strengthens to Category 4 intensity, skipping Category 3 status, about 180 mi (285 km) west-southwest of Manzanillo, Colima; this makes it the eighth major hurricane of the season. It simultaneously reaches its peak intensity, with maximum sustained winds of 140 mph (220 km/h) and a minimum barometric pressure of 918 mbar (27.11 inHg).
- 18:00 UTC (11:00 a.m. PDT) at 20.7°N 108.5°W – Hurricane Odile weakens to Category 3 intensity about 180 mi (285 km) southeast of the southern tip of the Baja California peninsula.

September 15

- 00:00 UTC (5:00 p.m. PDT, September 14) at 16.0°N 112.8°W – Tropical Depression Sixteen-E reaches a minimum barometric pressure of 1,005 mbar (29.68 inHg) about 510 mi (825 km) south-southwest of Cabo San Lucas, Baja California Sur.
- 04:45 UTC (9:45 p.m. PDT, September 14) at 22.9°N 109.9°W – Hurricane Odile makes its first landfall on the southern tip of the Baja California peninsula with sustained winds of 125 mph (205 km/h) and a barometric pressure of 941 mbar (27.79 inHg).
- 06:00 UTC (11:00 p.m. PDT, September 14) at 16.8°N 111.6°W – Tropical Depression Sixteen-E degenerates into a remnant low about 430 mi (695 km) south-southwest of Cabo San Lucas, Baja California Sur.
- 12:00 UTC (5:00 a.m. PDT) at 24.2°N 110.9°W – Hurricane Odile weakens to Category 2 intensity inland about 110 mi (175 km) northwest of the southern tip of the Baja California peninsula.
- 18:00 UTC (11:00 a.m. PDT) at 25.1°N 111.5°W – Hurricane Odile weakens to Category 1 intensity inland about 160 mi (260 km) south-southeast of Santa Rosalía, Baja California Sur.

September 16

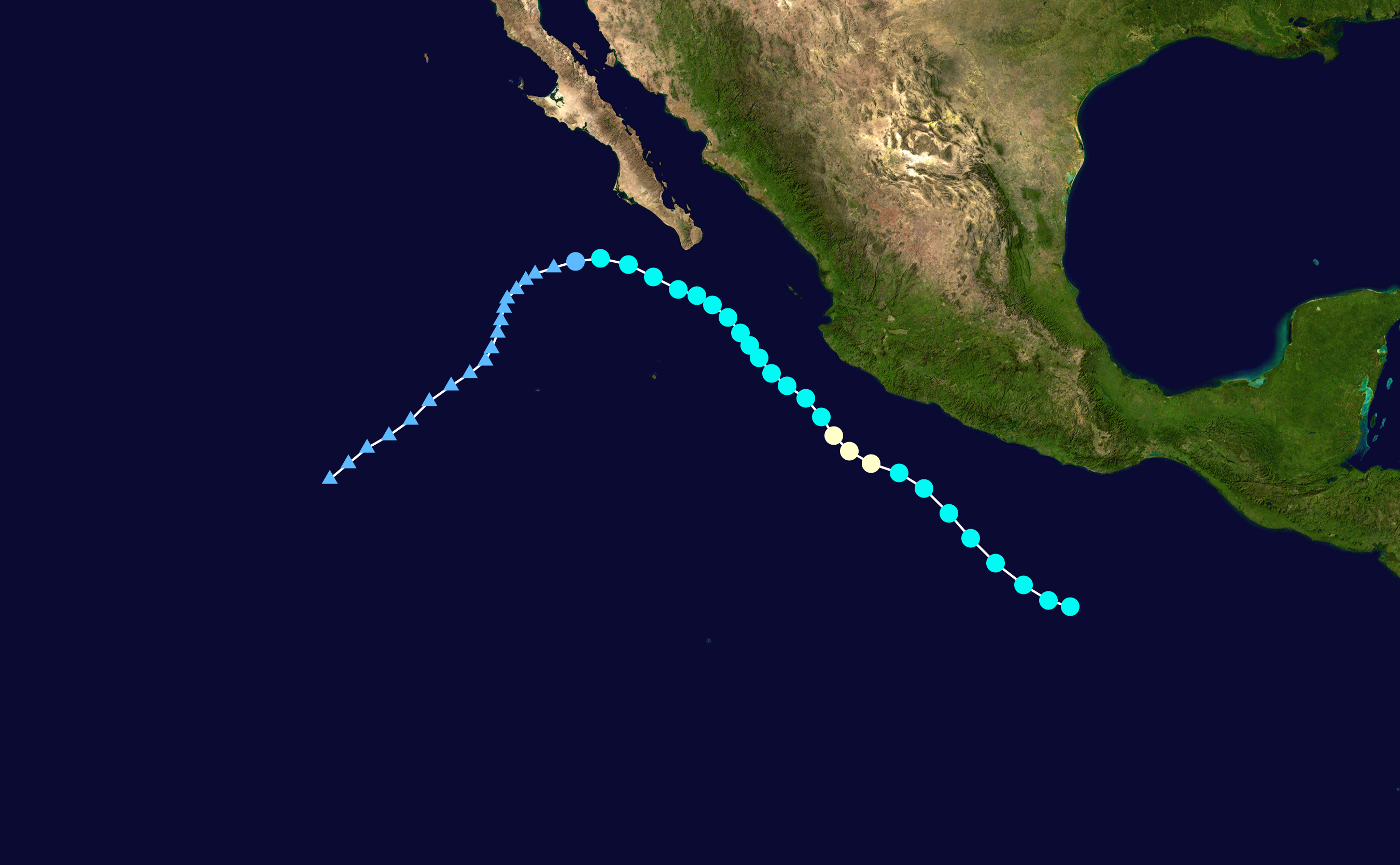
Storm path of Hurricane Polo

- 00:00 UTC (5:00 p.m. PDT, September 15) at 11.4°N 97.6°W – Tropical Storm Polo develops from a tropical wave about 310 mi (500 km) south of Puerto Escondido, Oaxaca.
- 06:00 UTC (11:00 p.m. PDT, September 15) at 27.0°N 112.5°W – Hurricane Odile weakens into a tropical storm inland about 30 mi (45 km) south-southwest of Santa Rosalía, Baja California Sur.

September 17

- 00:00 UTC (5:00 p.m. PDT, September 16) at 29.4°N 113.6°W – Tropical Storm Odile emerges over the Gulf of California just west of Isla Ángel de la Guarda.
- 16:30 UTC (9:30 a.m. PDT) at 30.7°N 113.1°W – Tropical Storm Odile makes its second and final landfall near Álvaro Obregón, Sonora, with sustained winds of 40 mph (65 km/h) and a barometric pressure of 999 mbar (29.50 inHg).
- 18:00 UTC (11:00 a.m. PDT) at 30.8°N 112.9°W – Tropical Storm Odile weakens into a tropical depression about 50 mi (85 km) southeast of Puerto Peñasco, Sonora.

September 18

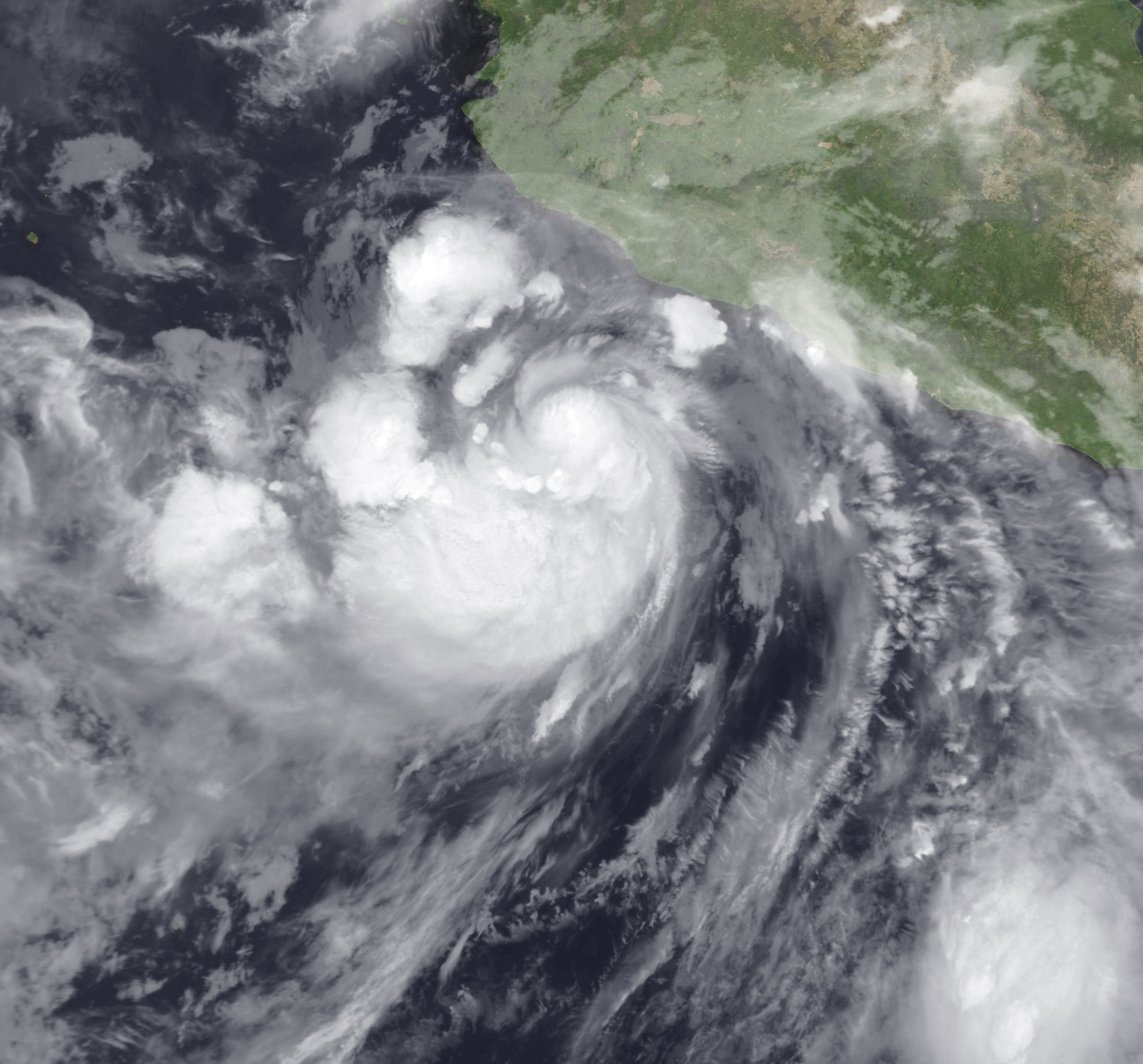
Short-wave infrared satellite image of Hurricane Polo at peak intensity early on September 18

- 00:00 UTC (5:00 p.m. PDT, September 17) at 31.0°N 112.0°W – Tropical Depression Odile is last noted as a tropical cyclone inland about 90 mi (150 km) east-southeast of Puerto Peñasco, Sonora; it dissipates six hours later over the mountainous terrain of the Sierra Madre Occidental.
- 00:00 UTC (5:00 p.m. PDT, September 17) at 16.0°N 104.0°W – Tropical Storm Polo strengthens into a Category 1 hurricane about 195 mi (315 km) southwest of Zihuatanejo, Guerrero; it simultaneously reaches its peak intensity, with maximum sustained winds of 75 mph (120 km/h) and a minimum barometric pressure of 979 mbar (28.91 inHg).
- 18:00 UTC (11:00 a.m. PDT) at 17.5°N 105.6°W – Hurricane Polo weakens into a tropical storm about 140 mi (220 km) southwest of Manzanillo, Colima.

September 22

- 06:00 UTC (11:00 p.m. PDT, September 21) at 22.5°N 113.5°W – Tropical Storm Polo weakens into a tropical depression about 225 mi (360 km) west of the southern tip of the Baja California peninsula.
- 12:00 UTC (5:00 a.m. PDT) at 22.3°N 114.2°W – Tropical Depression Polo degenerates into a remnant low about 270 mi (435 km) west of the southern tip of the Baja California peninsula.

September 24

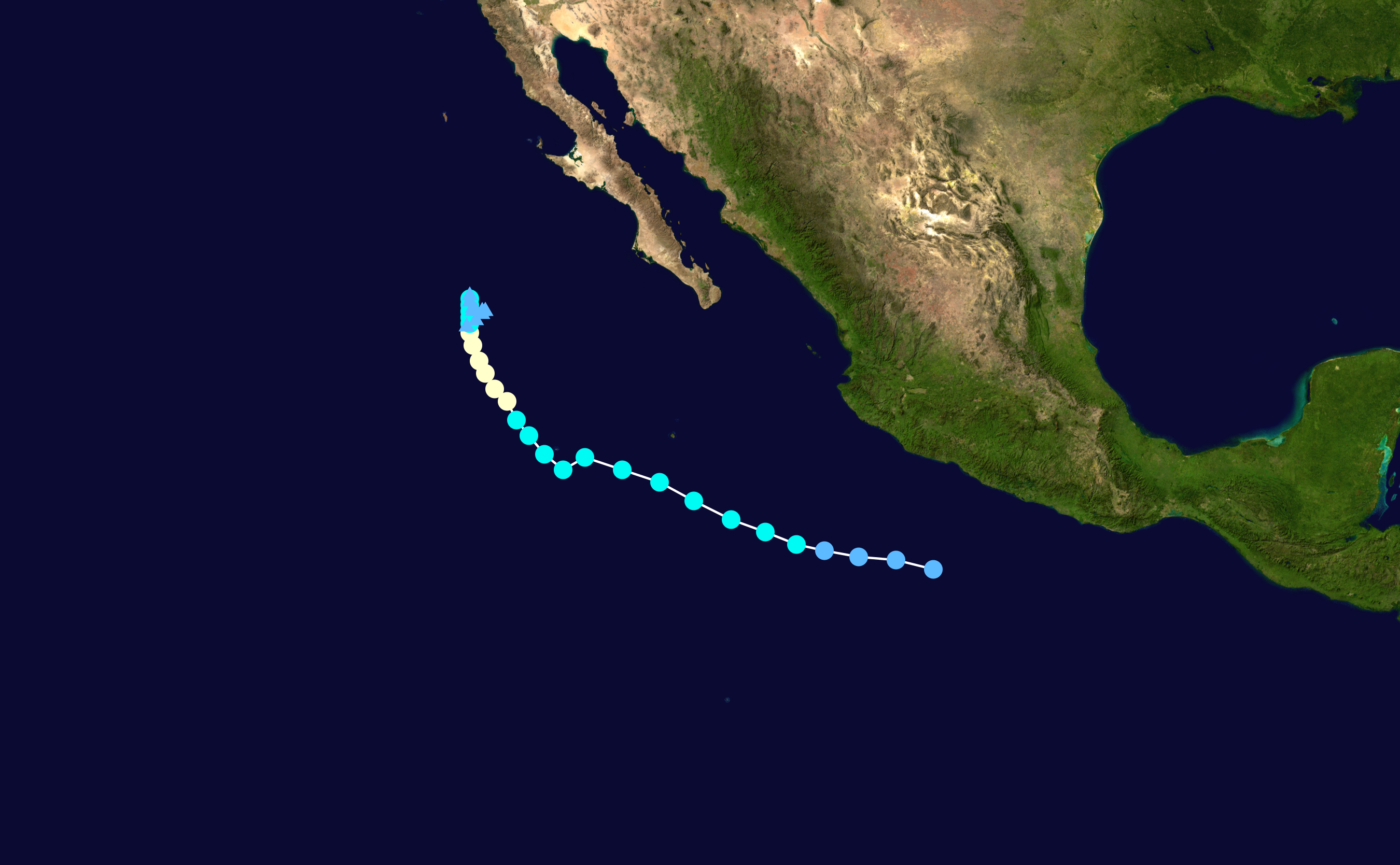
Storm path of Hurricane Rachel

- 00:00 UTC (5:00 p.m. PDT, September 23) at 14.5°N 102.6°W – A tropical depression develops from an area of low pressure about 240 mi (390 km) southwest of Acapulco, Guerrero.

September 25

- 00:00 UTC (5:00 p.m. PDT, September 24) at 15.3°N 107.0°W – The tropical depression strengthens into Tropical Storm Rachel about 315 mi (510 km) southwest of Manzanillo, Colima.

September 27

- 18:00 UTC (11:00 a.m. PDT) at 19.9°N 116.3°W – Tropical Storm Rachel strengthens into a Category 1 hurricane about 455 mi (730 km) west-southwest of the southern tip of the Baja California peninsula.

September 28

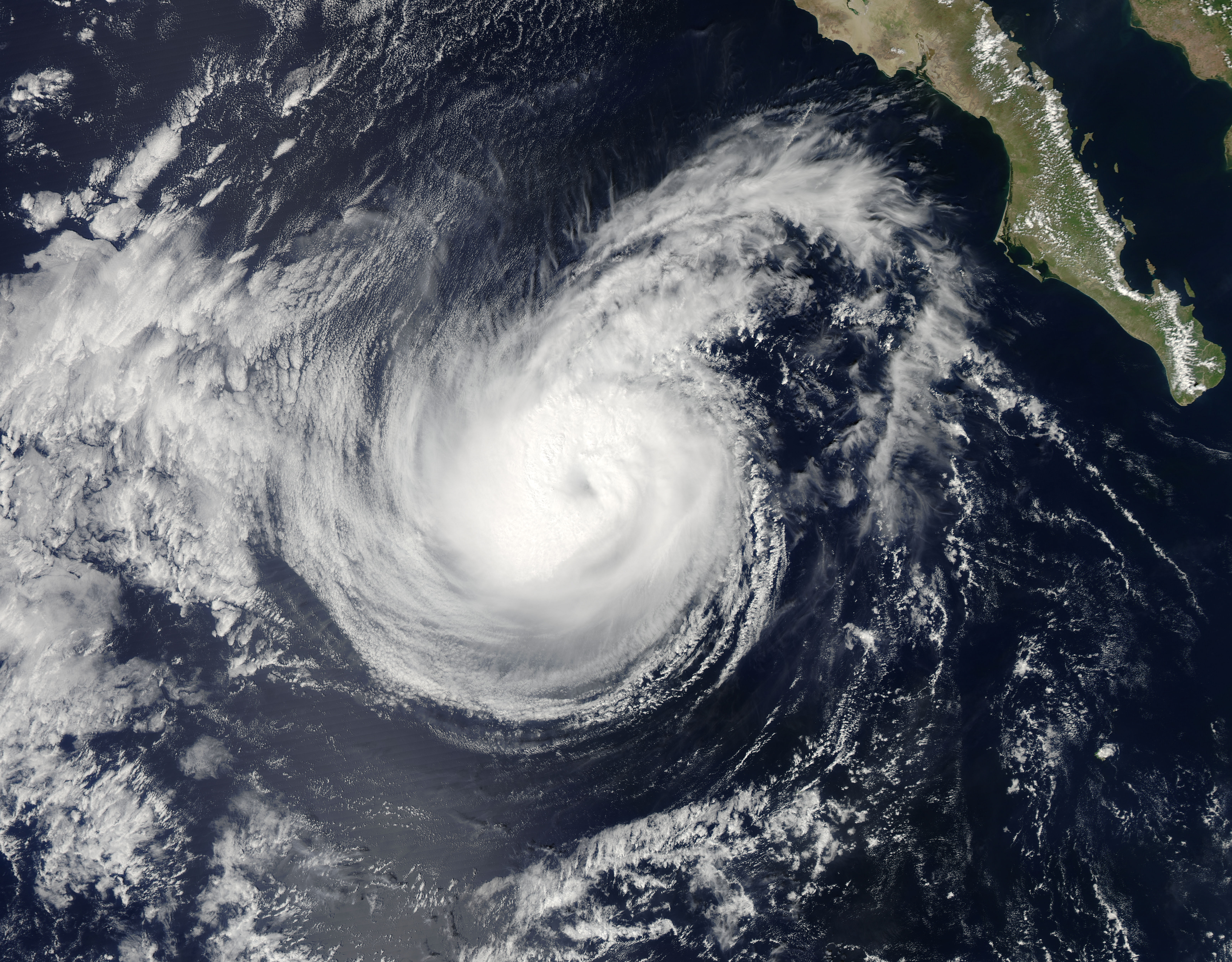
Satellite image of Hurricane Rachel shortly after peak intensity late on September 28

- 00:00 UTC (5:00 p.m. PDT, September 27) at 20.3°N 116.7°W – Hurricane Rachel reaches its peak intensity, with maximum sustained winds of 85 mph (140 km/h) and a minimum barometric pressure of 980 mbar (28.94 inHg), about 465 mi (750 km) west-southwest of the southern tip of the Baja California peninsula.

September 29

- 06:00 UTC (11:00 p.m. PDT, September 28) at 22.4°N 117.5°W – Hurricane Rachel weakens to a tropical storm about 485 mi (780 km) west of the southern tip of the Baja California peninsula.

September 30

- 12:00 UTC (5:00 a.m. PDT) at 23.3°N 117.5°W – Tropical Storm Rachel weakens below gale force and degenerates into a remnant low about 480 mi (770 km) west of the southern tip of the Baja California peninsula.

=== October ===
October 1

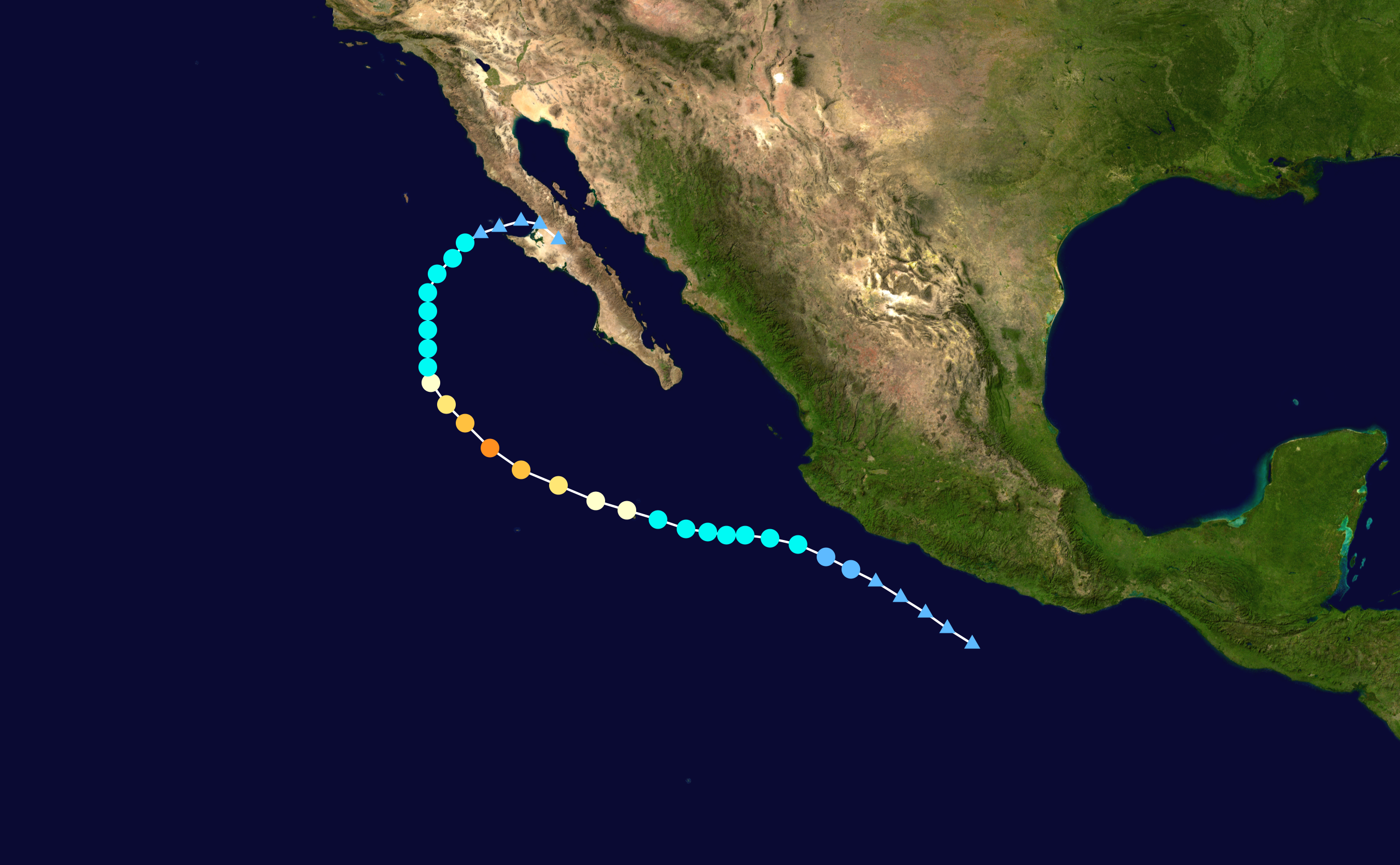
Storm path of Hurricane Simon

- 18:00 UTC (11:00 a.m. PDT) at 14.7°N 100.1°W – A tropical depression develops from an area of low pressure about 140 mi (220 km) south of Manzanillo, Colima.

October 2

- 06:00 UTC (11:00 p.m. PDT, October 1) at 17.9°N 105.7°W – The tropical depression strengthens into Tropical Storm Simon about 120 mi (195 km) southwest of Manzanillo, Colima.

October 4

- 00:00 UTC (5:00 p.m. PDT, October 3) at 19.0°N 111.2°W – Tropical Storm Simon strengthens into a Category 1 hurricane about 25 mi (35 km) northwest of Socorro Island.
- 12:00 UTC (5:00 a.m. PDT) at 19.8°N 113.4°W – Hurricane Simon strengthens to Category 2 intensity about 175 mi (280 km) west-northwest of Socorro Island.
- 18:00 UTC (11:00 a.m. PDT) at 20.3°N 114.6°W – Hurricane Simon strengthens to Category 3 intensity about 260 mi (415 km) west-northwest of Socorro Island, making it the ninth and final major hurricane of the season.

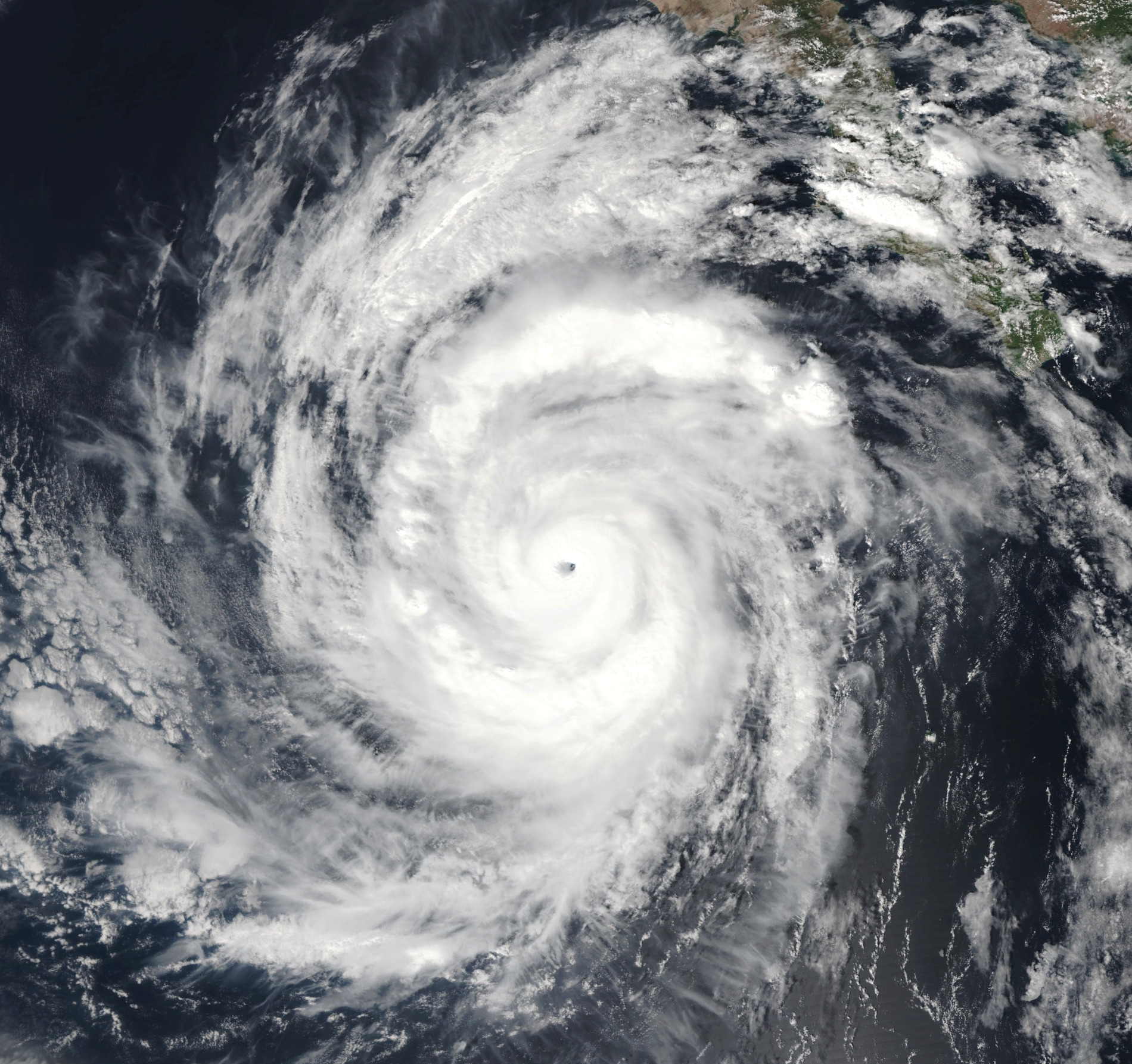
Satellite image of Hurricane Simon shortly before peak intensity late on October 4

October 5

- 00:00 UTC (5:00 p.m. PDT, October 4) at 21.0°N 115.6°W – Hurricane Simon strengthens to Category 4 intensity about 385 mi (620 km) west-southwest of the southern tip of the Baja California peninsula; it simultaneously reaches its peak intensity, with maximum sustained winds of 130 mph (215 km/h) and a minimum barometric pressure of 946 mbar (27.94 inHg).
- 06:00 UTC (11:00 p.m. PDT, October 4) at 21.8°N 116.4°W – Hurricane Simon weakens to Category 3 intensity about 420 mi (675 km) west of the southern tip of the Baja California peninsula.
- 12:00 UTC (5:00 a.m. PDT) at 22.4°N 117.0°W – Hurricane Simon weakens to Category 2 intensity about 450 mi (725 km) west of the southern tip of the Baja California peninsula.
- 18:00 UTC (11:00 a.m. PDT) at 23.1°N 117.5°W – Hurricane Simon weakens to Category 1 intensity about 480 mi (770 km) west of the southern tip of the Baja California peninsula.

October 6

- 00:00 UTC (5:00 p.m. PDT, October 5) at 23.6°N 117.6°W – Hurricane Simon weakens into a tropical storm about 490 mi (790 km) west of the southern tip of the Baja California peninsula.

October 8

- 00:00 UTC (5:00 p.m. PDT, October 7) at 27.9°N 115.9°W – Tropical Storm Simon weakens below gale force and degenerates into a remnant low about 50 mi (85 km) west of Punta Eugenia, Baja California Sur.

October 13

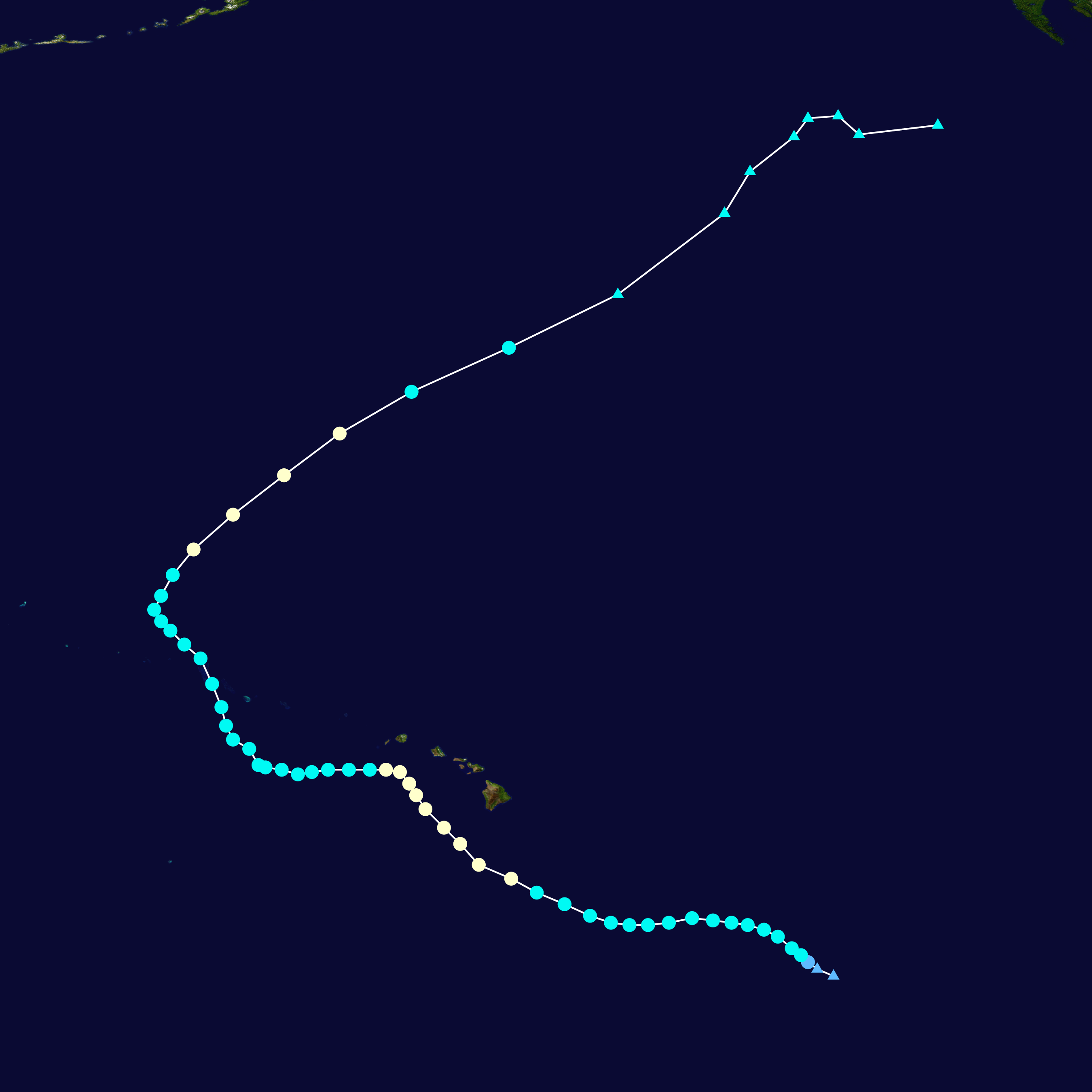
Storm path of Hurricane Ana

- 18:00 UTC (8:00 a.m. HST) at 12.4°N 142.0°W – Tropical Depression Two-C develops from an area of low pressure about 1,015 mi (1,630 km) east-southeast of South Point, Hawaii.

October 14

- 00:00 UTC (2:00 p.m. HST, October 13) at 12.7°N 142.3°W – Tropical Depression Two-C strengthens into Tropical Storm Ana about 985 mi (1,585 km) east-southeast of South Point, Hawaii.

October 15

- 06:00 UTC (8:00 p.m. HST, October 14) at 14.1°N 145.3°W – Tropical Storm Ana reaches its initial peak intensity with sustained winds of 70 mph (110 km/h) and a barometric pressure of 994 mbar (29.35 inHg) about 765 mi (1,230 km) east-southeast of South Point, Hawaii.

October 17

- 12:00 UTC (5:00 a.m. PDT) at 14.6°N 98.8°W – A tropical depression develops from an area of low pressure about 175 mi (280 km) south-southeast of Acapulco, Guerrero.
- 18:00 UTC (8:00 a.m. HST) at 16.0°N 154.8°W – After its winds oscillate between 60 mph (95 km/h) and 70 mph (110 km/h) for two days, Tropical Storm Ana strengthens into a Category 1 hurricane about 205 mi (335 km) south-southeast of South Point, Hawaii.
- 18:00 UTC (11:00 a.m. PDT) at 15.3°N 99.0°W – The aforementioned tropical depression strengthens into Tropical Storm Trudy about 120 mi (195 km) south-southeast of Acapulco, Guerrero.

October 18

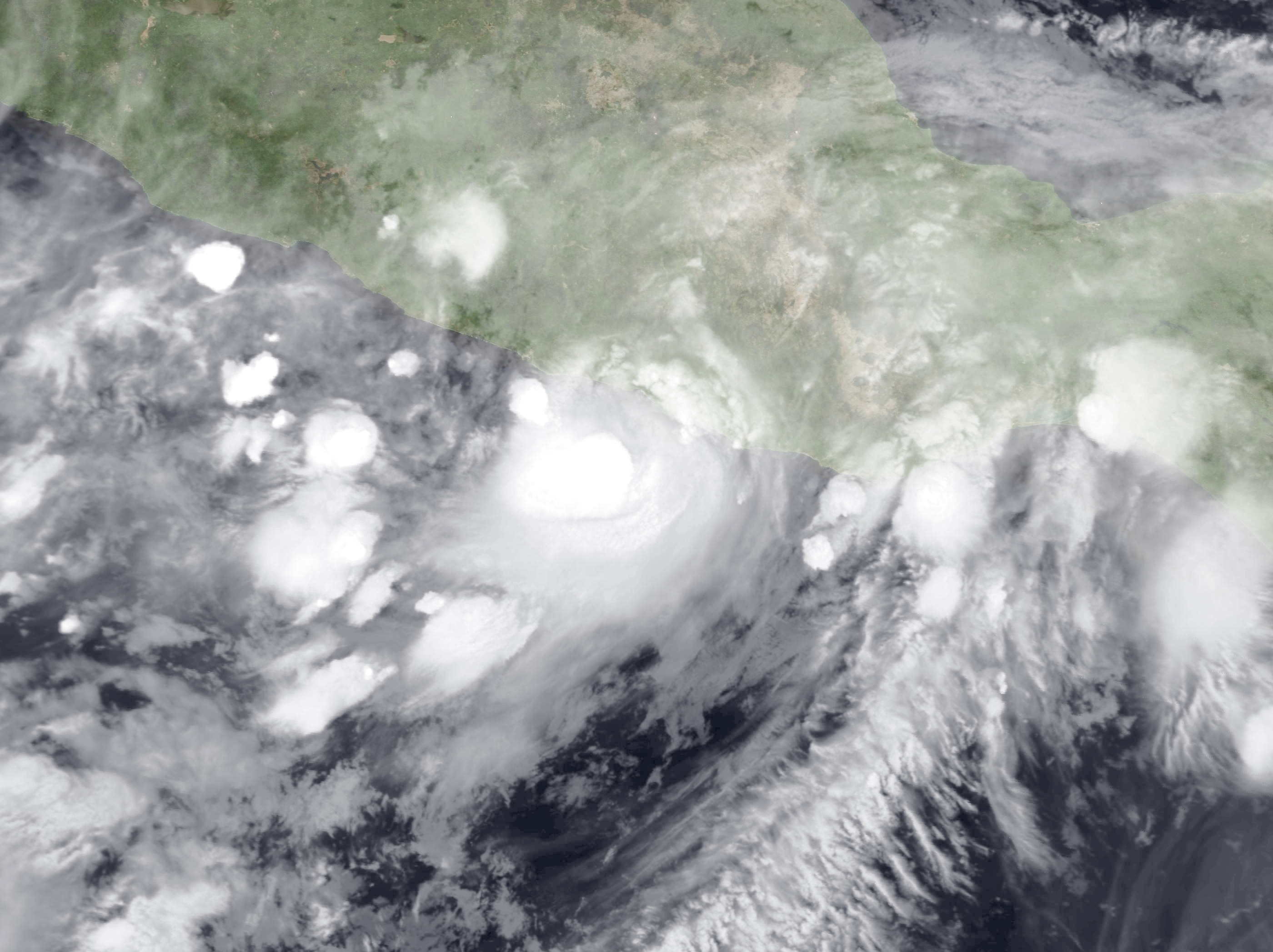
Short-wave infrared satellite image of Tropical Storm Trudy approaching Mexico near peak intensity early on October 18

- 06:00 UTC (8:00 p.m. HST, October 17) at 17.5°N 157.0°W – Hurricane Ana reaches its peak intensity, with maximum sustained winds of 85 mph (140 km/h) and a minimum barometric pressure of 985 mbar (29.09 inHg), about 130 mi (215 km) southwest of South Point, Hawaii.
- 09:15 UTC (2:15 a.m. PDT) at 16.5°N 98.8°W – Tropical Storm Trudy reaches its peak intensity, with maximum sustained winds of 65 mph (100 km/h) and a minimum barometric pressure of 998 mbar (29.47 inHg); it simultaneously makes landfall a short distance southeast of Marquelia, Guerrero.
- 18:00 UTC (11:00 a.m. PDT) at 17.1°N 98.4°W – Tropical Storm Trudy weakens into a tropical depression inland about 45 mi (75 km) northeast of Marquelia, Guerrero.

October 19

- 00:00 UTC (5:00 p.m. PDT, October 18) at 17.3°N 98.2°W – Tropical Depression Trudy is last noted as a tropical cyclone inland about 65 mi (100 km) northeast of Marquelia, Guerrero; it dissipates six hours later over the mountainous terrain of southern Mexico.

October 20

- 00:00 UTC (2:00 p.m. HST, October 19) at 20.7°N 160.9°W – Hurricane Ana weakens into a tropical storm about 85 mi (140 km) south-southwest of the Hawaiian island of Niihau.

October 25

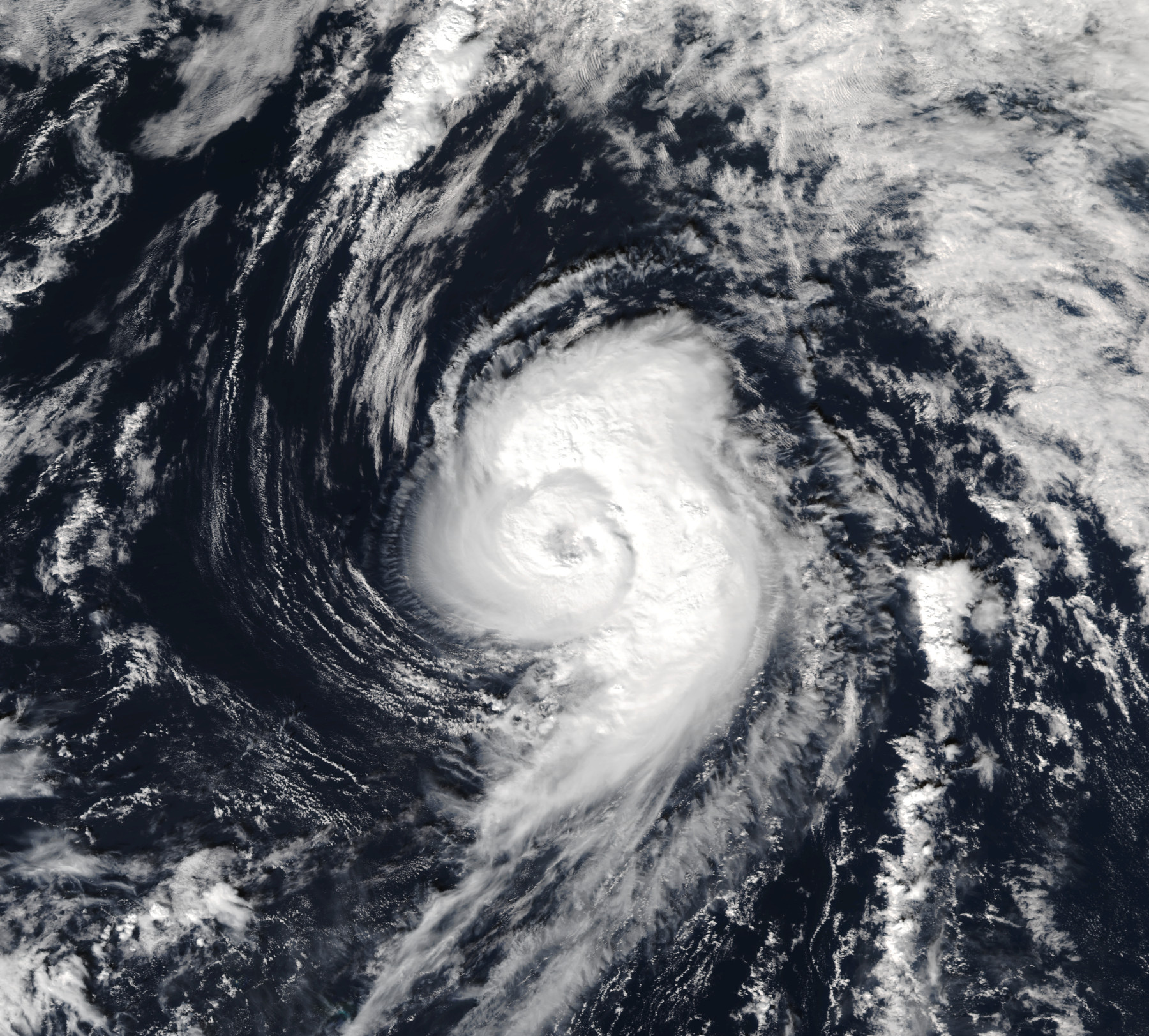
Satellite image of Hurricane Ana near its secondary peak intensity early on October 25

- 00:00 UTC (2:00 p.m. HST, October 24) at 30.2°N 168.5°W – Tropical Storm Ana restrengthens into a Category 1 hurricane about 370 mi (595 km) northeast of the Papahānaumokuākea Marine National Monument; its sustained winds simultaneously reach a secondary peak of 75 mph (120 km/h).
- 06:00 UTC (8:00 p.m. HST, October 24) at 31.7°N 166.8°W – The barometric pressure of Hurricane Ana reaches a secondary minimum of 987 mbar (29.15 inHg) while Ana is centered about 510 mi (825 km) northeast of the Papahānaumokuākea Marine National Monument.

October 26

- 00:00 UTC (2:00 p.m. HST, October 25) at 37.0°N 159.1°W – Hurricane Ana weakens back into a tropical storm about 1,075 mi (1,735 km) northeast of the Papahānaumokuākea Marine National Monument.
- 12:00 UTC (2:00 a.m. HST) at 41.2°N 150.2°W – Tropical Storm Ana transitions into an extratropical cyclone about 1,630 mi (2,620 km) northeast of the Papahānaumokuākea Marine National Monument.

October 30

- 06:00 UTC (11:00 p.m. PDT, October 29) at 11.0°N 100.0°W – A tropical depression develops from an area of low pressure about 405 mi (650 km) south of Acapulco, Guerrero.

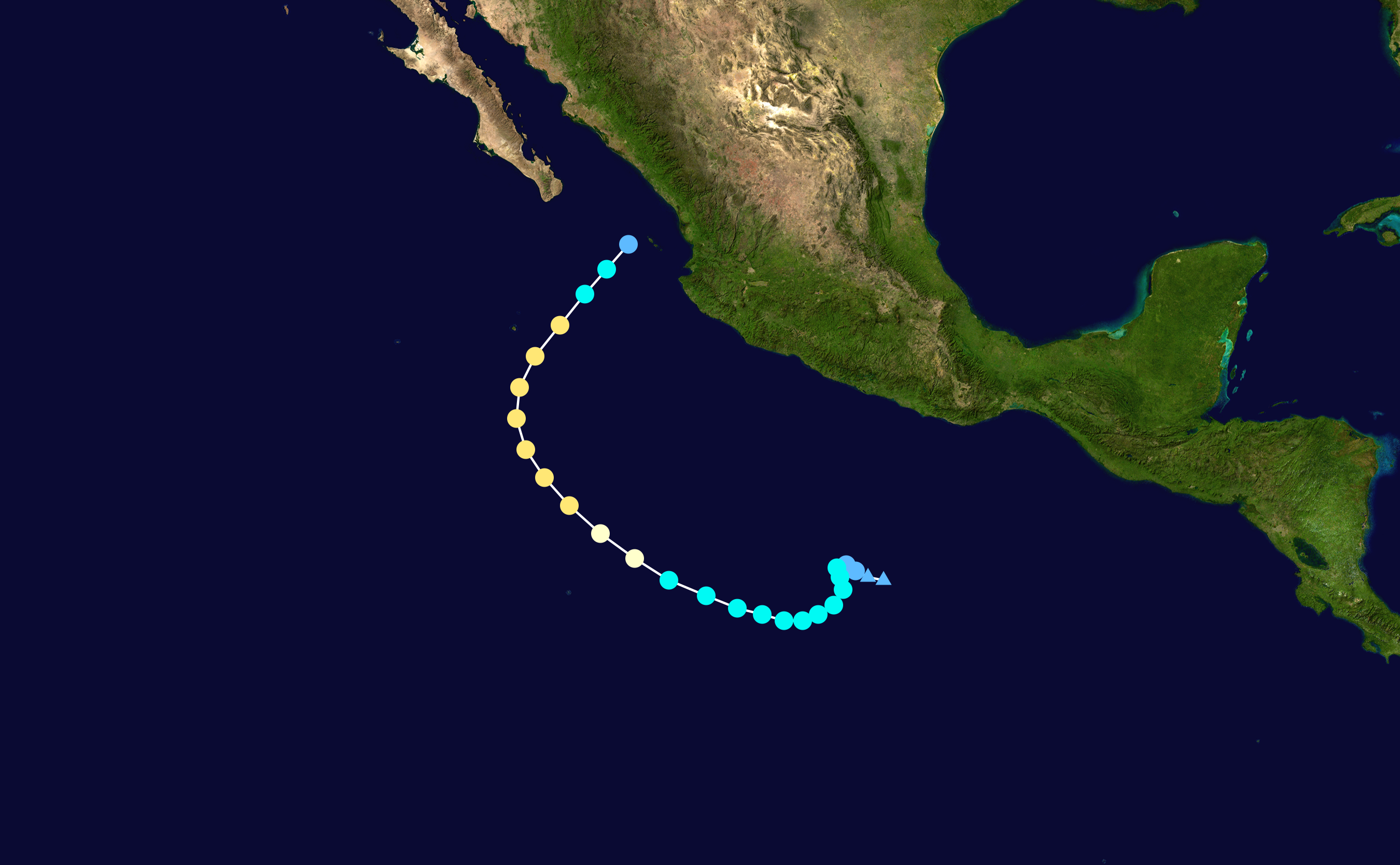
Storm path of Hurricane Vance

- 18:00 UTC (11:00 a.m. PDT) at 11.1°N 100.6°W – The tropical depression strengthens into Tropical Storm Vance about 405 mi (650 km) south of Acapulco, Guerrero.

October 31

- 06:00 UTC (11:00 p.m. PDT, October 30) at 10.4°N 100.4°W – Tropical Storm Vance reaches its initial peak intensity, with sustained winds of 50 mph (85 km/h) and a barometric pressure of 1,002 mbar (29.59 inHg), about 450 mi (725 km) south of Acapulco, Guerrero.

=== November ===
November 2

- 12:00 UTC (4:00 a.m. PST) (Note: On November 2, daylight saving time ended in most areas of the basin, which resulted in the gap between UTC and local time widening by one hour. Hawaii was not affected; the state has not observed daylight saving time since 1945.) at 11.4°N 107.1°W – Tropical Storm Vance strengthens into a Category 1 hurricane about 560 mi (900 km) south-southwest of Manzanillo, Colima.

November 3

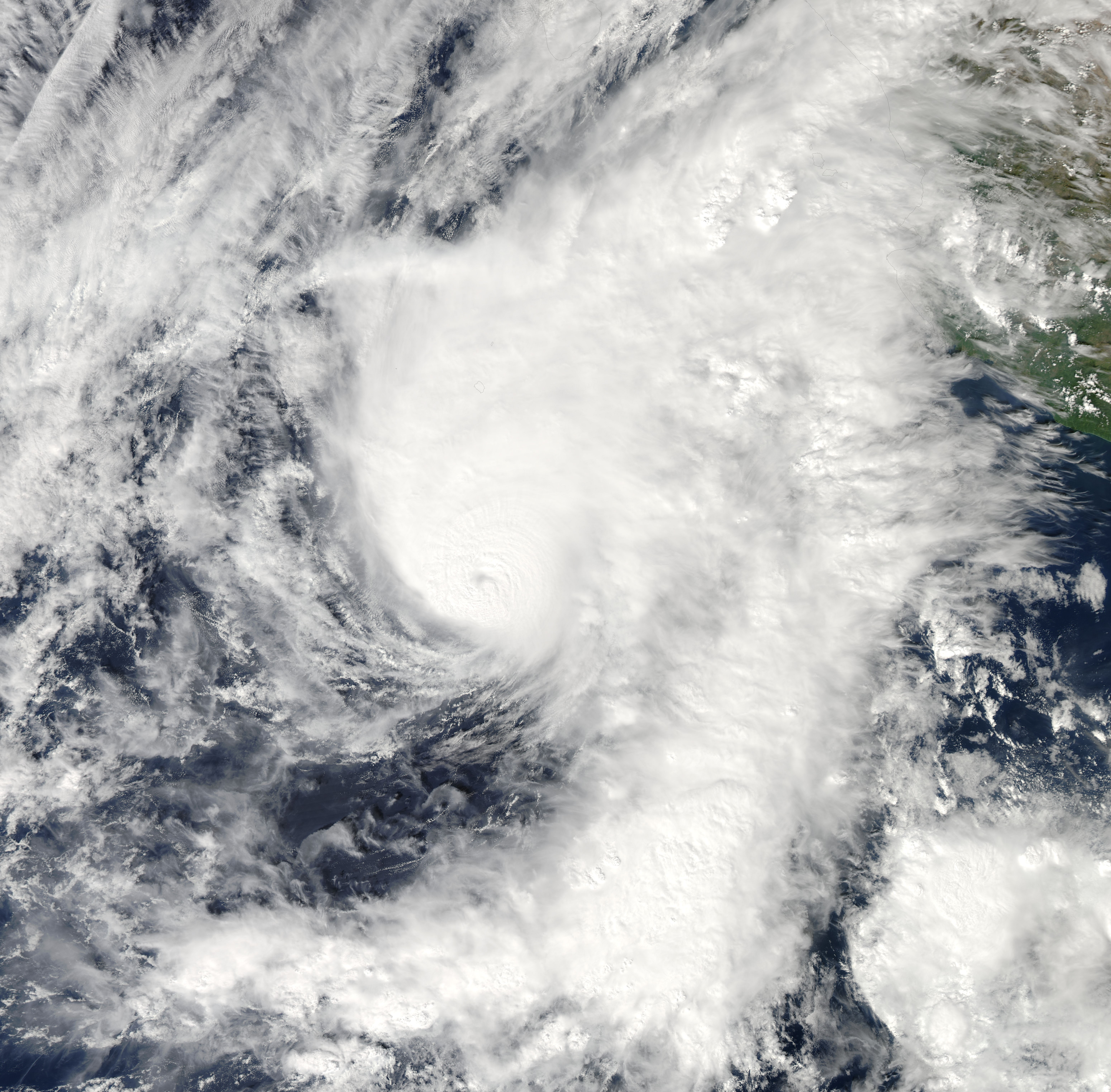
Satellite image of Hurricane Vance at peak intensity late on November 3

- 00:00 UTC (4:00 p.m. PST, November 2) at 13.1°N 109.2°W – Hurricane Vance strengthens to Category 2 intensity about 525 mi (845 km) southwest of Manzanillo, Colima.
- 18:00 UTC (10:00 a.m. PST) at 15.9°N 110.9°W – Hurricane Vance reaches its peak intensity, with maximum sustained winds of 110 mph (175 km/h) and a minimum barometric pressure of 964 mbar (28.47 inHg), about 485 mi (780 km) west-southwest of Manzanillo, Colima.

November 4

- 18:00 UTC (10:00 a.m. PST) at 19.9°N 108.7°W – Hurricane Vance rapidly weakens into a tropical storm, skipping Category 1 status, about 175 mi (280 km) southwest of the Islas Marías.

November 5

- 06:00 UTC (10:00 p.m. PST, November 4) at 21.5°N 107.3°W – Tropical Storm Vance weakens into a tropical depression about 40 mi (65 km) west of the Islas Marías; it degenerates into an open trough six hours later, marking its dissipation as a tropical cyclone.

November 30

- The 2014 Pacific hurricane season officially ends.

== See also ==
- List of Pacific hurricanes
- Timeline of the 2014 Pacific typhoon season
- Timeline of the 2014 Atlantic hurricane season
