= Timeline of the 2014 Pacific typhoon season =

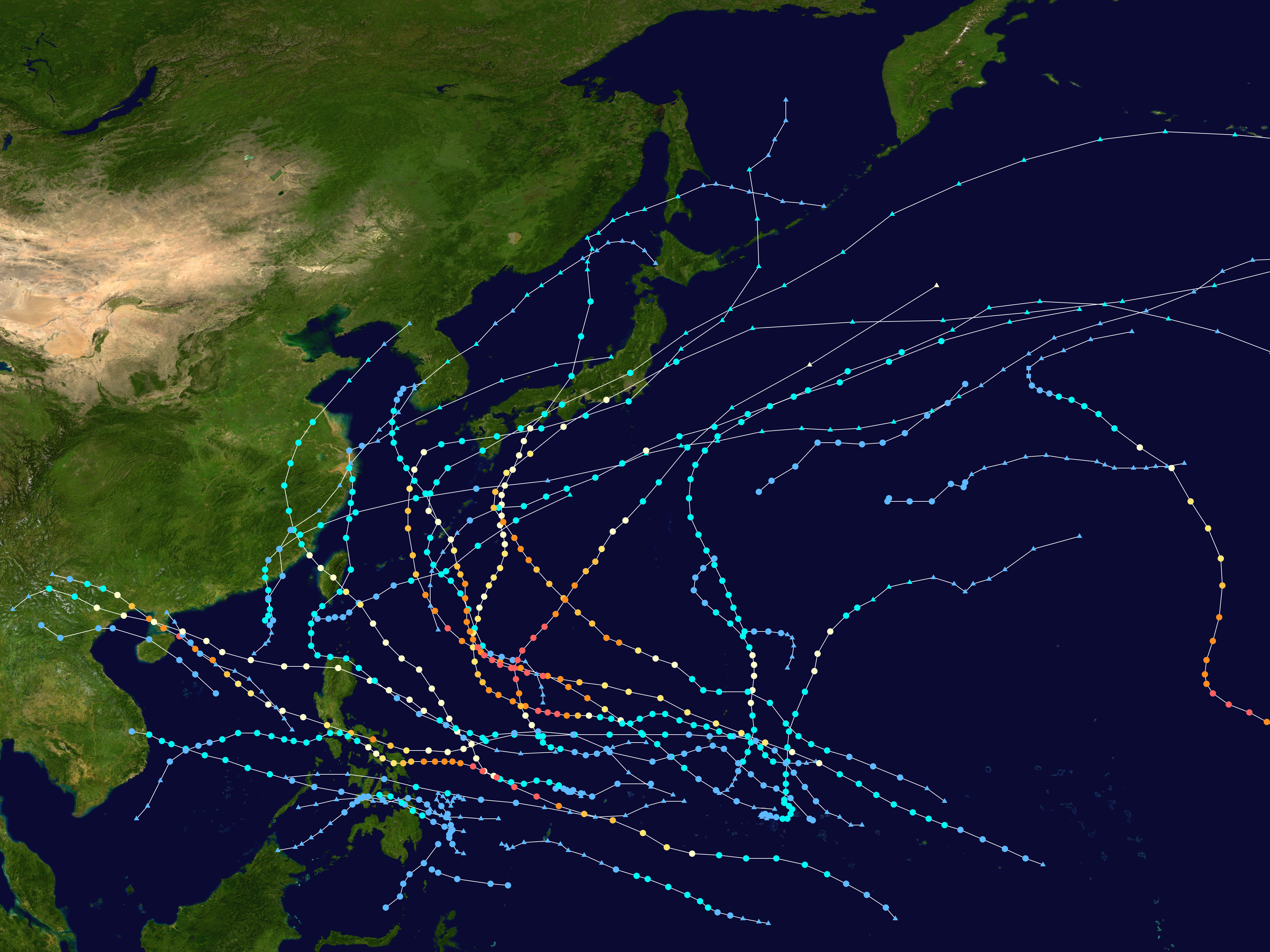
- Season summary map

Season boundaries
- First system formed: January 10, 2014
- Last system dissipated: January 1, 2015

Strongest system
- Name: Vongfong
- Maximum winds: 215 km/h (130 mph) (10-minute sustained)
- Lowest pressure: 900 hPa (mbar)

Longest lasting system
- Name: Halong
- Duration: 15 days
Storm articles
- Tropical Storm Hagibis (2014)
- Typhoon Neoguri (2014)
- Typhoon Rammasun
- Typhoon Matmo (2014)
- Typhoon Halong (2014)
- Tropical Storm Nakri (2014)
- Hurricane Genevieve (2014)
- Typhoon Kalmaegi (2014)
- Tropical Storm Fung-wong (2014)
- Typhoon Phanfone (2014)
- Typhoon Vongfong (2014)
- Typhoon Nuri (2014)
- Typhoon Hagupit (2014)
- Tropical Storm Jangmi (2014)

The 2014 Pacific typhoon season had a relatively below-normal quantity of tropical cyclones. During the season, 30 systems were designated as Tropical Depressions by either, the Japan Meteorological Agency (JMA), the Philippine Atmospheric, Geophysical and Astronomical Services Administration (PAGASA), the Joint Typhoon Warning Center (JTWC), or other National Meteorological and Hydrological Services such as the China Meteorological Administration and the Hong Kong Observatory. Of those, eight became super typhoons, including seven Category 5 storms. During the season, six typhoons underwent rapid deepening. The first half of the season was relatively active with seven named storms forming due to a developing weak El Niño, however this failed during August. The most active month in the season was July, with four storms developing and making landfall, with three of them reaching super typhoon strength. With this, the season became quiet as of August 15, following the dissipation of Genevieve, although only few depressions formed but never strengthened into tropical storms. This continued until the first week of September, as the tropics within the basin started to get active again, with three tropical depressions in the same time. Tropical activity began to rise again during mid-September, although the season became quiet again after the dissipation of Vongfong, with a pause of Nuri's lifecycle.

This timeline documents tropical cyclone formations, strengthening, weakening, landfalls, extratropical transitions, and dissipations during the season in the Pacific Ocean, north of the equator between 100°E and the International Date Line. The time stamp for each event is stated using Coordinated Universal Time (UTC), the 24-hour clock where 00:00 = midnight UTC. Additionally, figures for maximum sustained winds and position estimates are rounded to the nearest 5 units (Kilometres or miles). Direct wind observations are rounded to the nearest whole number. Meteorological observations typically report atmospheric pressures are measured in hectopascals per the recommendation of the World Meteorological Organization, and the nearest hundredth of an inches of mercury or millibars (hectopascals).

== Timeline of events ==
=== January ===
January 15

- 00:00 UTC – The Japan Meteorological Agency (JMA) reports that a tropical depression has formed while located roughly 405 km (250 mi) (Note: The figures for maximum sustained winds and position estimates are rounded to the nearest 5 units (knots, miles, or kilometers), following the convention used in the Japan Meteorological Agency and Joint Typhoon Warning Center's operational products for each storm. All other units are rounded to the nearest digit.) east of Surigao City, Philippines.

January 18

- 00:00 UTC – The JMA reports that the tropical depression previously located east of Surigao City has intensified into a tropical storm and names it "Lingling". Simultaneously, they report that the storm has attained its peak intensity, with maximum 10-minute sustained winds of 65 km/h (40 mph).
- 00:00 UTC – The Joint Typhoon Warning Center (JTWC) designates Tropical Storm Lingling as Tropical Depression 01W. Simultaneously, they report that the storm has attained its peak intensity, with maximum 1-minute sustained winds of 55 km/h (35 mph).

January 19

- 18:00 UTC – The JTWC reports that Tropical Depression Lingling (01W) has weakened into an area of low pressure while located roughly 385 km (240 mi) southeast of Davao City, Philippines.

January 20

- 00:00 UTC – The JMA reports that Tropical Storm Lingling (01W) has weakened into a tropical depression.
- 00:00 UTC – The JTWC reports that the remnants of Lingling (01W) have dissipated while located roughly 430 km (265 mi) southeast of Davao City.
- 12:00 UTC – The JMA reports that Tropical Depression Lingling (01W) has dissipated while located roughly 405 km (250 mi) southeast of Davao City.

January 29

- 00:00 UTC – The JMA reports that a tropical depression has formed while located roughly 475 km (295 mi) southwest of Guam.

January 30

- 18:00 UTC – The JTWC designates the tropical depression previously located southwest of Guam as Tropical Depression 02W.

January 31

- 00:00 UTC – The JMA reports that Tropical Depression 02W has intensified into a tropical storm and names it "Kajiki". Simultaneously, they report that the storm has attained its peak intensity, with maximum 10-minute sustained winds of 65 km/h (40 mph).
- 06:00 UTC – The JTWC reports that Tropical Depression Kajiki (02W) has intensified into a tropical storm. Simultaneously, they report that the storm has attained its peak intensity, with maximum 1-minute sustained winds of 55 km/h (35 mph).
- 12:00 – 18:00 UTC – Tropical Storm Kajiki (02W) makes landfall near Abuyog, Philippines with 10-minute sustained winds of 65 km/h (40 mph).
- 18:00 UTC – The JTWC reports that Tropical Storm Kajiki (02W) has weakened into a tropical depression.
- 18:00 – 00:00 UTC (1 February) – Tropical Storm Kajiki (02W) makes landfalls twice, near Tabogon, Philippines and Barotac Viejo, Philippines with 10-minute sustained winds of 65 km/h (40 mph).

=== February ===
February 1

- 00:00 UTC – The JTWC reports that Tropical Depression Kajiki (02W) has weakened into an area of low pressure while located roughly 65 km (40 mi) northwest of Roxas City, Philippines.
- 06:00 UTC – The JMA reports that Tropical Storm Kajiki (02W) has weakened into a tropical depression.
- 06:00 UTC – The JTWC reports that the remnants of Kajiki (02W) have dissipated while located roughly 230 km (145 mi) northwest of Roxas City.
- 06:00 – 12:00 UTC – Tropical Depression Kajiki (02W) makes landfall near El Nido, Philippines with 10-minute sustained winds of 55 km/h (35 mph).
- 18:00 UTC – The JMA reports that Tropical Depression Kajiki (02W) has dissipated while located roughly 145 km (90 mi) northwest of Puerto Princesa, Philippines.

February 27

- 12:00 UTC – The JMA reports that a tropical depression has formed about 620 km (385 mi) southeast of Guam.

February 28

- 00:00 UTC – The JTWC designates the tropical depression previously located southeast of Guam as Tropical Depression 03W.
- 12:00 UTC – The JMA reports that Tropical Depression 03W has intensified into a tropical storm, and names it "Faxai".
- 18:00 UTC – The JTWC reports that Tropical Depression Faxai (03W) has intensified into a tropical storm.

=== March ===
March 3

- 06:00 UTC – The JMA reports that Tropical Storm Faxai (03W) has intensified into a severe tropical storm.

March 4

- 12:00 UTC – The JMA reports that Severe Tropical Storm Faxai (03W) has intensified into a typhoon. Simultaneously, they report that the storm has attained its peak intensity, with maximum 10-minute sustained winds of 120 km/h (75 mph).
- 12:00 UTC – The JTWC reports that Tropical Storm Faxai (03W) has intensified into a category 1 typhoon.
- 18:00 UTC – The JTWC reports that Typhoon Faxai (03W) has attained its peak intensity, with maximum 1-minute sustained winds of 145 km/h (90 mph).

March 5

- 00:00 UTC – The JMA reports that Typhoon Faxai (03W) has weakened into a severe tropical storm.
- 06:00 UTC – The JTWC reports that Typhoon Faxai (03W) has weakened into a tropical storm.
- 12:00 UTC – The JMA reports that Severe Tropical Storm Faxai (03W) has weakened into a tropical storm.
- 12:00 UTC – The JTWC reports that Tropical Storm Faxai (03W) has transitioned into an extratropical cyclone while located roughly 1,345 km (835 mi) northwest of Wake Island.
- 18:00 UTC – The JMA reports that Tropical Storm Faxai (03W) has transitioned into an extratropical cyclone while located roughly 1,255 km (780 mi) northwest of Wake Island.

March 6

- 12:00 UTC – The JTWC reports that the extratropical remnants of Faxai have dissipated while located 900 km (560 mi) northwest of Wake Island.

March 8

- 18:00 UTC – The JMA reports that the extratropical remnants of Faxai have dissipated while located roughly 785 km (490 mi) northeast of Wake Island.

March 18

- 06:00 UTC — The JMA reports that a tropical depression has developed about 170 km (105 mi) to the south of Yap Island.

March 20

- 18:00 UTC — PAGASA initiates warnings on the tropical depression and names it Caloy.

March 21

- 20:00 UTC — Tropical Depression Caloy makes landfall on the Philippine island of Mindanao, in the vicinity of Tandag Surigao Del Sur.

March 22

- 00:00 UTC — The JTWC initiates warnings on the tropical depression and assigns it the designation 04W.
- 18:00 UTC — The JTWC issues its final advisory on Tropical Depression Caloy.

=== April ===
April 2

- 18:00 UTC — The JMA reports that a tropical depression has formed about 1,260 km (785 mi) to the north-northeast of Port Moresby, Papua New Guinea.

April 3

- 00:00 UTC — The JTWC initiates advisories on the tropical depression and assigns it the designation 05W.

April 4

- 18:00 UTC — The JTWC reports that Tropical Depression 05W has intensified into a tropical storm.

April 5

- 00:00 UTC — The JMA reports that Tropical Depression 05W has intensified into a tropical storm and names it Peipah. They also estimate that the system has peaked with 10-minute sustained wind speeds of 65 km/h (45 mph).
- 12:00 UTC — The JMA reports that Tropical Storm Peipah has weakened into a tropical depression.

April 6

- 06:00 UTC — PAGASA reports that Tropical Depression Peipah has entered its area of responsibility and names it Domeng.
- 12:00 UTC — The JTWC reports that Tropical Storm Peipah (Domeng) has weakened into a tropical depression.

April 8

- 06:00 UTC — The JMA reports that Tropical Depression Peipah (Domeng) has dissipated to the southeast of Manila on the Philippine island of Luzon.

April 10

- 06:00 UTC — The JTWC issues its final advisory on Tropical Depression Peipah (Domeng), as the system has weakened into a tropical disturbance.

April 13

- 12:00 UTC — The JMA reports that a tropical depression has developed, while located about 1,000 km (620 mi) to the southeast of Manila.

April 15

- 06:00 UTC — The tropical depression is last noted by the JMA, while located about 745 km (465 mi) to the southeast of Manila.

April 19

- 12:00 UTC — The JMA reports that a tropical depression has developed about 480 km (300 mi) to the southwest of Hagåtña, Guam.

April 21

- 00:00 UTC — The tropical depression is last noted by the JMA, while it is located about 1,130 km (700 mi) to the southwest of Hagåtña, Guam.

April 27

- 00:00 UTC — The JMA reports that a tropical depression has developed about 415 km (260 mi) to the southeast of Hagåtña, Guam.
- 12:00 UTC — The JTWC initiates advisories on the tropical depression and assigns it the designation 06W.

April 28

- 00:00 UTC — Both the JTWC and the JMA report that the tropical depression has intensified into a tropical storm, with the JMA naming the system Tapah.

April 29

- 00:00 UTC — The JMA reports that Tropical Storm Tapah has peaked with 10-minute sustained wind speeds of 95 km/h (60 mph) which makes it a severe tropical storm.
- 00:00 UTC — The JTWC reports that Tropical Storm Tapah has intensified into a typhoon.
- 06:00 UTC — The JTWC reports that Typhoon Tapah has peaked with 1-minute sustained wind speeds of 130 km/h (80 mph) while equivalent to a Category 1 typhoon on the SSHWS.
- 18:00 UTC — The JTWC reports that Typhoon Tapah has weakened into a tropical storm.

April 30

- 06:00 UTC — The JMA reports that Severe Tropical Storm Tapah has weakened into a tropical storm.

=== May ===
May 1

- 00:00 UTC — The JMA reports that Tropical Storm Tapah has weakened into a tropical depression.
- 09:00 UTC — The JTWC reports that Tropical Storm Tapah has weakened into a tropical depression and issues its final advisory on the system.

May 2

- 12:00 UTC — The JMA reports that Tropical Depression Tapah has dissipated, about 1,300 km (810 mi) to the southeast of Tokyo, Japan.

=== June ===
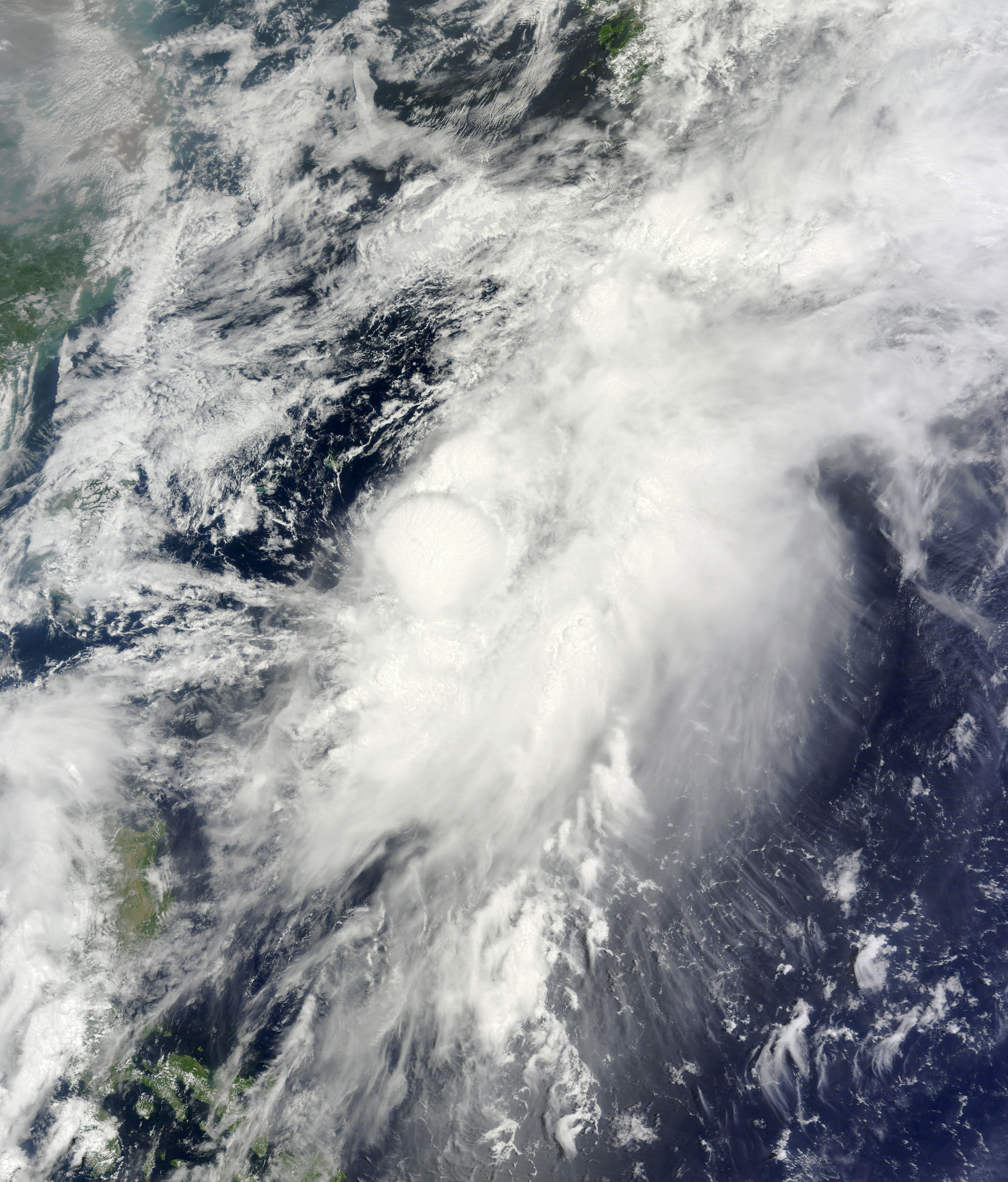
Tropical Storm Mitag at peak intensity on June 11

June 9

- 00:00 UTC — The JMA reports that a tropical depression has developed about 475 km (295 mi) to the south-southwest of Taipei, Taiwan.

June 10

- 03:00 UTC — PAGASA initiates advisories on the tropical depression, previously located to the south-southwest of Taipei, Taiwan and names it Ester.

June 11

- 00:00 UTC — The JMA reports that Tropical Depression Ester has intensified into a tropical storm.
- 06:00 UTC — The JMA names Tropical Storm Ester: Mitag as they estimate that the system has peaked with 10-minute sustained wind speeds of 75 km/h (45 mph).

June 12

- 00:00 UTC — The JMA reports that Tropical Storm Mitag (Ester) has weakened into a tropical depression.
- 00:00 UTC — The JMA reports that a tropical depression has developed about 890 km (555 mi) to the south-southwest of Taipei, Taiwan.
- 06:00 UTC — The JMA reports that Tropical Depression Mitag (Ester) has dissipated.

June 14

- 00:00 UTC — The JMA reports that the tropical depression previously located to the south-southwest of Taipei, Taiwan has developed into a tropical storm.
- 06:00 UTC — The JMA names the tropical storm: Hagibis.
- 06:00 UTC — The JTWC initiates advisories on Tropical Storm Hagibis and assigns it the designation 07W.

June 15

- 08:50 UTC — Tropical Storm Hagibis made landfall at Shantou in the Chinese province of Guangdong.
- 12:00 UTC — The JTWC issues its final advisory on Tropical Storm Hagibis, after the system had made landfall on China.
- 18:00 UTC — The JMA reports that Tropical Storm Hagibis has weakened into a tropical depression over Guangdong.

June 16

- 18:00 UTC — The JTWC re-initiates advisories on Tropical Depression Hagibis, after the system has moved into the East China Sea.

June 17

- 00:00 UTC — The JMA reports that Tropical Depression Hagibis has re-intensified into a tropical storm and estimates that it has reached its peak intensity with 10-minute sustained wind speeds of 75 km/h (45 mph).
- 12:00 UTC — The JMA reports that Tropical Storm Hagibis has weakened into a tropical depression, as the system passes near or over the Japanese region of Kyūshū.
- 18:00 UTC — The JMA reports that Tropical Depression Hagibis, has transitioned into an extratropical cyclone.

June 23

- 00:00 UTC — The JMA stops monitoring the extratropical remnants of Tropical Storm Hagibis, as they move into the Eastern Pacific.

=== July ===
July 2

- 12:00 UTC — The JMA reports that a tropical depression has developed about 600 km (375 mi) to the southeast of Hagatna, Guam.

July 3

- 00:00 UTC — The JTWC initiates advisories on the tropical depression and assigns it the designation 08W.
- 18:00 UTC — The JMA and JTWC report that Tropical Depression 08W has intensified into a tropical storm.

July 4

- 00:00 UTC — The JMA names the tropical storm: Neoguri.
- 12:00 UTC — The JMA reports that Tropical Storm Neoguri, has intensified into a typhoon.
- 18:00 UTC — The JTWC reports that Tropical Storm Neoguri has intensified and become equivalent to a Category 1 typhoon on the SSHWS.

July 5

- 00:00 UTC — The JTWC reports that Typhoon Neoguri has become equivalent to a Category 2 typhoon on the SSHWS.
- 06:00 UTC — The JTWC reports that Typhoon Neoguri has become equivalent to a Category 4 typhoon on the SSHWS.
- 15:00 UTC — PAGASA reports that Typhoon Neoguri, is about to enter the Philippine area of responsibility and names it Florita.

July 6

- 18:00 UTC — The JMA reports that Typhoon Neoguri (Florita) has reached its peak intensity, with 10-minute sustained wind speeds of 185 km/h (115 mph).
- 18:00 UTC — The JTWC reports that Typhoon Neoguri (Florita) has become a super typhoon.

July 7

- 00:00 UTC — The JTWC reports that Super Typhoon Neoguri (Florita) has reached its peak intensity with 1-minute sustained wind speeds of 250 km/h (155 mph).
- 18:00 UTC — The JTWC reports that Super Typhoon Neoguri (Florita) has weakened into a typhoon and become equivalent to a Category 3 typhoon on the SSHWS.

July 8

- 18:00 UTC — The JTWC reports that Typhoon Neoguri (Florita) has weakened and become equivalent to a Category 2 typhoon on the SSHWS.

July 9

- 06:00 UTC — The JMA reports that a tropical depression has developed about 1,200 km (745 mi) to the southeast of Hagåtña, Guam.
- 06:00 UTC — The JMA reports that Typhoon Neoguri (Florita) has weakened into a severe tropical storm.
- 12:00 UTC — The JTWC reports that Typhoon Neoguri (Florita) has weakened into a tropical storm.

July 10

- 00:00 UTC — The JMA reports that Typhoon Neoguri (Florita) has made landfall over the island of Kyushu.
- 12:00 UTC — The JTWC issues its final advisory on Tropical Storm Neoguri (Florita) as it transitions into an extratropical cyclone and issues its final advisory.
- 12:00 UTC — The JTWC initiates advisories on the tropical depression that was previously located to the southeast of Hagåtña, Guam and assigns it the designation 09W.
- 18:00 UTC — The JMA reports that Severe Tropical Storm Neoguri (Florita) has weakened into a tropical storm.

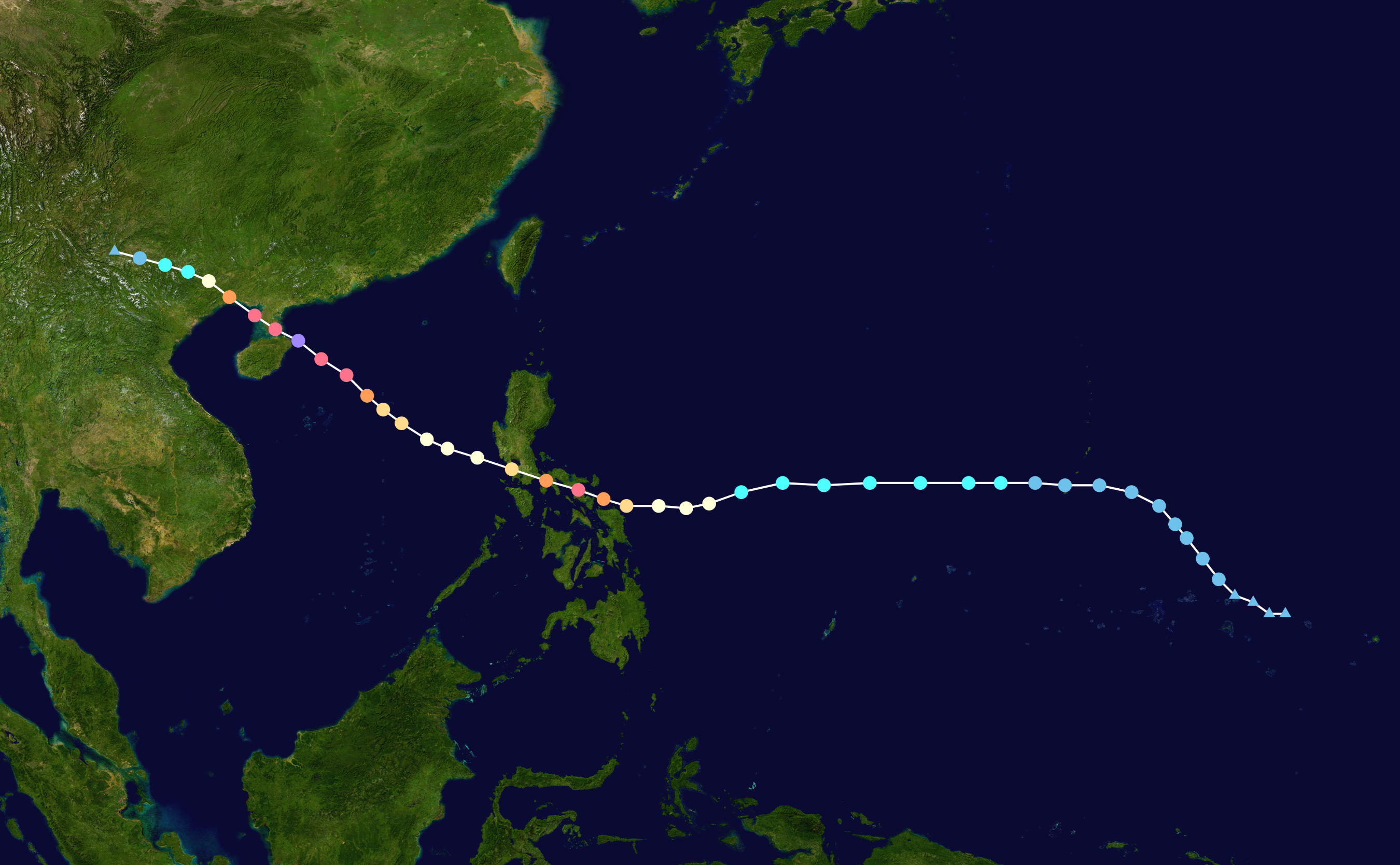
Path of Rammasun in mid-July

July 11

- 00:00 UTC — The JMA reports that Tropical Storm Neoguri (Florita) has transitioned into an extratropical cyclone.
- 00:00 UTC — The JTWC reports that Tropical Depression 09W has intensified into a tropical storm.
- 06:00 UTC — The JMA reports that Tropical Depression 09W has intensified into a tropical storm and names it Rammasun.
- 12:00 UTC — The JTWC reports that Tropical Storm Rammasun has weakened into a tropical depression.

July 13

- 00:00 UTC — The JTWC reports that Tropical Depression Rammasun has re-intensified into a tropical storm.
- 00:00 UTC — PAGASA names Tropical Storm Rammasun: Glenda, as it enters the Philippine area of responsibility.
- 12:00 UTC — The JMA reports that the extratropical remnants of former Typhoon Neoguri (Florita), have dissipated within the Sea of Okhotsk.

July 14

- 00:00 UTC — The JMA reports that Tropical Storm Rammasun has intensified into a severe tropical storm.
- 12:00 UTC — The JTWC reports that Tropical Storm Rammasun has intensified and become equivalent to a Category 1 typhoon on the SSHWS.
- 18:00 UTC — The JMA reports that Severe Tropical Storm Rammasun has intensified into a typhoon.

July 15

- 06:00 UTC — The JTWC reports that Tropical Storm Rammasun has intensified and become equivalent to a Category 3 typhoon on the SSHWS.

July 16

- 06:00 UTC — The JMA reports that a tropical depression, has developed to the northeast of Palau.
- 12:00 UTC — The JMA reports that Typhoon Rammasun has weakened into a severe tropical storm.

July 17

- 00:00 UTC — The JMA reports that Severe Tropical Storm Rammasun has re-intensified into a typhoon.
- 06:00 UTC — Typhoon Rammasun intensifies back into a Category 4 typhoon.
- 12:00 UTC — The JMA reports that the tropical depression previously located to the northeast of Palau has become a tropical storm.
- 12:00 UTC — The JTWC initiates advisories on the tropical depression and assigns it the designation: 10W.
- 18:00 UTC — The JMA names the tropical storm: Matmo.
- 18:00 UTC — The JTWC reports that Tropical Depression Matmo has intensified into a tropical storm.
- 21:00 UTC — PAGASA reports that Tropical Storm Matmo has entered the Philippine area of responsibility and names it Henry.

July 18

- 06:00 UTC — Rammasun still slowly intensifies as the JTWC classifies it as a super typhoon.
- 06:00 UTC — The JMA reports that Typhoon Rammasun has peaked with 10-minute sustained wind speeds of 165 km/h (105 mph).
- 07:30 UTC — Typhoon Rammasun makes landfall at Wenchang on the island of Hainan, before emerging into the Qiongzhou Strait.
- 11:30 UTC — Typhoon Rammasun makes landfall at Xuwen County in the Chinese province of Guangdong, before emerging into the Gulf of Tonkin.
- 18:00 UTC — The JMA reports that Tropical Storm Matmo has intensified into a severe tropical storm.
- 23:10 UTC — Typhoon Rammasun makes landfall at Fangchenggang in the Chinese province of Guangxi.

July 19

- 00:00 UTC — The JMA reports that Typhoon Rammasun has weakened into a severe tropical storm over the Chinese Province of Guangxi.
- 00:00 UTC — The JTWC issues its final advisory on Typhoon Rammasun as it weakens and becomes equivalent to a Category 3 typhoon on the SSHWS over the Chinese Province of Guangxi.
- 06:00 UTC — The JMA reports that Severe Tropical Storm Rammasun has weakened into a tropical storm over the Chinese Province of Guangxi.
- 12:00 UTC — The JTWC reports that Tropical Storm Matmo has become equivalent to a Category 1 typhoon on the SSHWS.
- 12:00 UTC — The JMA starts monitoring another tropical depression located east of Guam.
- 18:00 UTC — The JTWC made its final warning on Rammasun.

July 20

- 06:00 UTC — The JMA reports that Tropical Depression Rammasun has dissipated over the Chinese Province of Yunnan.
- 18:00 UTC — The JMA reports that Severe Tropical Storm Matmo has intensified into a typhoon.

July 22

- 03:00 UTC — The tropical depression becomes better organized, as the JTWC issues a tropical cyclone formation alert on the depression.
- 15:00 UTC — The JTWC upgrades Matmo to a Category 2 typhoon on the SSHWS.
- 16:15 UTC — Typhoon Matmo makes landfall on Taitung, Taiwan, before emerging into the Taiwan Strait.
- 18:00 UTC — The JMA reports that Typhoon Matmo has weakened into a severe tropical storm.
- 21:00 UTC — The tropical depression weakens to a LPA.

July 23

- 06:00 UTC — Matmo slightly weakens to a Category 1 typhoon on the SSHWS.
- Matmo makes landfall over eastern China.
- 12:00 UTC — The JMA reports that Severe Tropical Storm Matmo has weakened into a tropical storm, while located over the Chinese province of Fujian.
- 15:00 UTC — The JTWC issues its final advisory on Matmo, as it rapidly weakens to a moderate tropical storm and declares it extratropical.

July 25

- 06:00 UTC — The JMA reports that Tropical Storm Matmo has transitioned into an extratropical cyclone, while located over the Yellow Sea.
- 09:10 UTC — The extratropical remnants of Typhoon Matmo make landfall at Rongcheng in the Chinese province of Shandong.

July 26

- 06:00 UTC — The JMA reports that the extratropical remnants, of Typhoon Matmo have dissipated over North Korea.

July 27

- 18:00 UTC — The JMA reports that a tropical depression has developed about 800 km (495 mi) to the southeast of Hagåtña, Guam.

July 28

- 06:00 UTC — The JMA reports that a tropical depression has developed about 1,400 km (870 mi) to the northeast of Manila, Philippines.
- 09:00 UTC — The other tropical depression east of the Philippines starts to move in a northward direction and intensify.
- 15:00 UTC — The JTWC designates the depression near the Caroline Islands as 11W.

July 29

- 00:00 UTC — PAGASA initiates advisories on the tropical depression and names it Inday.
- 00:00 UTC — The JMA reports that Tropical Depression Inday has intensified into a tropical storm.
- 06:00 UTC — The JMA names Tropical Depression Jose: Halong.
- 12:00 UTC — The JMA reports that Tropical Depression Inday has intensified into a tropical storm.
- 21:00 UTC — The JMA names Tropical Storm Inday: Nakri.

July 31

- 18:00 UTC — The JMA reports that tropical storms Halong and Nakri (Inday) have intensified into severe tropical storms.

=== August ===
August 1

- 18:00 UTC — The JMA reports that Severe Tropical Storm Halong has intensified into a typhoon.

August 2

- 06:00 UTC — Halong intensifies into a Category 4 typhoon, just before entering the PAR.
- 06:00 UTC — The JTWC initiates advisories on Tropical Storm Nakri (Inday) and assigns it the designation 12W.
- 12:00 UTC — The JMA reports that Severe Tropical Storm Nakri (Inday) has weakened into a tropical storm.
- 18:00 UTC — Due to the explosive intensification of Halong, JTWC upgrades it to a Category 5 super typhoon.

August 3

- 06:00 UTC — The JTWC reports that Tropical Storm Nakri has weakened into a tropical depression.
- 21:00 UTC — The JTWC issues its final advisory on Tropical Depression Nakri (Inday), as the system approached South Korea's west coast.

August 4

- 00:00 UTC — Halong starts to undergo an eyewall replacement cycle, as it weakens to a mid-Category 4 typhoon.
- 06:00 UTC — The JMA reports that Tropical Depression Nakri has dissipated over South Korea.

August 6

- 03:00 UTC — Halong weakens to a minimal typhoon, due to the continuation of the eyewall replacement cycle.

August 7

- 06:00 UTC — The JMA reports that Hurricane Genevieve, has become a typhoon as it moves into the basin from the Central Pacific.
- 06:00 UTC — The JTWC reports that Typhoon Genevieve has entered the basin, while equivalent to a Category 4 super typhoon on the SSHWS.
- 12:00 UTC — The JTWC reports that Typhoon Genevieve has become equivalent, to a Category 5 super typhoon on the SSHWS.
- 18:00 UTC — The JMA reports that Typhoon Genevieve has reached its peak intensity, with 10-minute sustained windspeeds of 205 km/h (125 mph).

August 8

- 12:00 UTC — The JTWC reports that Genevieve has weakened and become equivalent to a Category 4 super typhoon on the SSHWS.
- 18:00 UTC — The JTWC reports that Genevieve has weakened and become equivalent to a Category 4 typhoon on the SSHWS.

August 10

- 06:00 UTC — The JMA reports that Typhoon Halong has weakened into a severe tropical storm.
- 18:00 UTC — The JMA reports that Typhoon Genevieve has weakened into a severe tropical storm.

August 11

- 00:00 UTC — The JMA reports that Severe Tropical Storm Halong has transitioned into an extratropical cyclone.
- 00:00 UTC — The JTWC issues their final warning on Halong, as it degenerates into an extratropical cyclone.
- 06:00 UTC — The JMA reports that Severe Tropical Storm Genevieve has weakened into a tropical storm.

August 12

- 06:00 UTC — The JMA reports that Tropical Storm Genevieve has weakened into a tropical depression.

August 14

- 12:00 UTC — The JMA reports that Tropical Depression Genevieve has dissipated.

August 15

- 06:00 UTC — The JMA reports that the extratropical remnants of Typhoon Halong have dissipated.

August 19

- 00:00 UTC — The JMA briefly monitors a tropical depression, that was located to the northeast of Hong Kong, China.

August 27

- 06:00 UTC — The JMA monitors another tropical depression in the South China Sea.
- 18:00 UTC — The system shows a bit of intensification, as it nearly makes landfall over Hainan Island.

August 29

- 03:00 UTC — Although, the depression is located over land and with this, it transitioned into an overland low-pressure.
- 18:00 UTC — A low-pressure area forms from an area of convection southeast of Palau.

August 31

- 00:00 UTC — It intensifies into a tropical disturbance and enters an area of favorable conditions of strengthening into a tropical storm in the next couple of days.

=== September ===
September 4

- 06:00 UTC — The JMA reports that a tropical depression has developed about 1,885 km (1,170 mi) to the southeast of Tokyo, Japan.

September 5

- 12:00 UTC — The JMA reports that a tropical depression has developed about 800 km (495 mi) to the southeast of Taipei, Taiwan.
- 18:00 UTC — The JMA stops monitoring the tropical depression previously located to the southeast of Tokyo, Japan.
- 18:00 UTC — The JMA reports that a tropical depression has developed within the South China Sea about 400 km (250 mi) to the west of Manila, Philippines.

September 6

- 09:00 UTC — PAGASA names the tropical depression Karding.
- 18:00 UTC — The JMA reports that the tropical depression previously located to the southeast of Taipei, Taiwan, has intensified into a tropical storm.

September 7

- 00:00 UTC — The JMA names the tropical storm Fengshen.
- 00:00 UTC — The JTWC starts monitoring Fengshen as a tropical depression and assigns it the designation 13W.
- 06:00 UTC — The JTWC reports that Tropical Depression Fengshen has intensified into a tropical storm.
- 06:00 UTC — The JTWC initiates advisories on Tropical Depression Karding and assigns it the designation 14W.
- 18:00 UTC — The JMA reports that Tropical Storm Fengshen has intensified into a severe tropical storm.

September 8

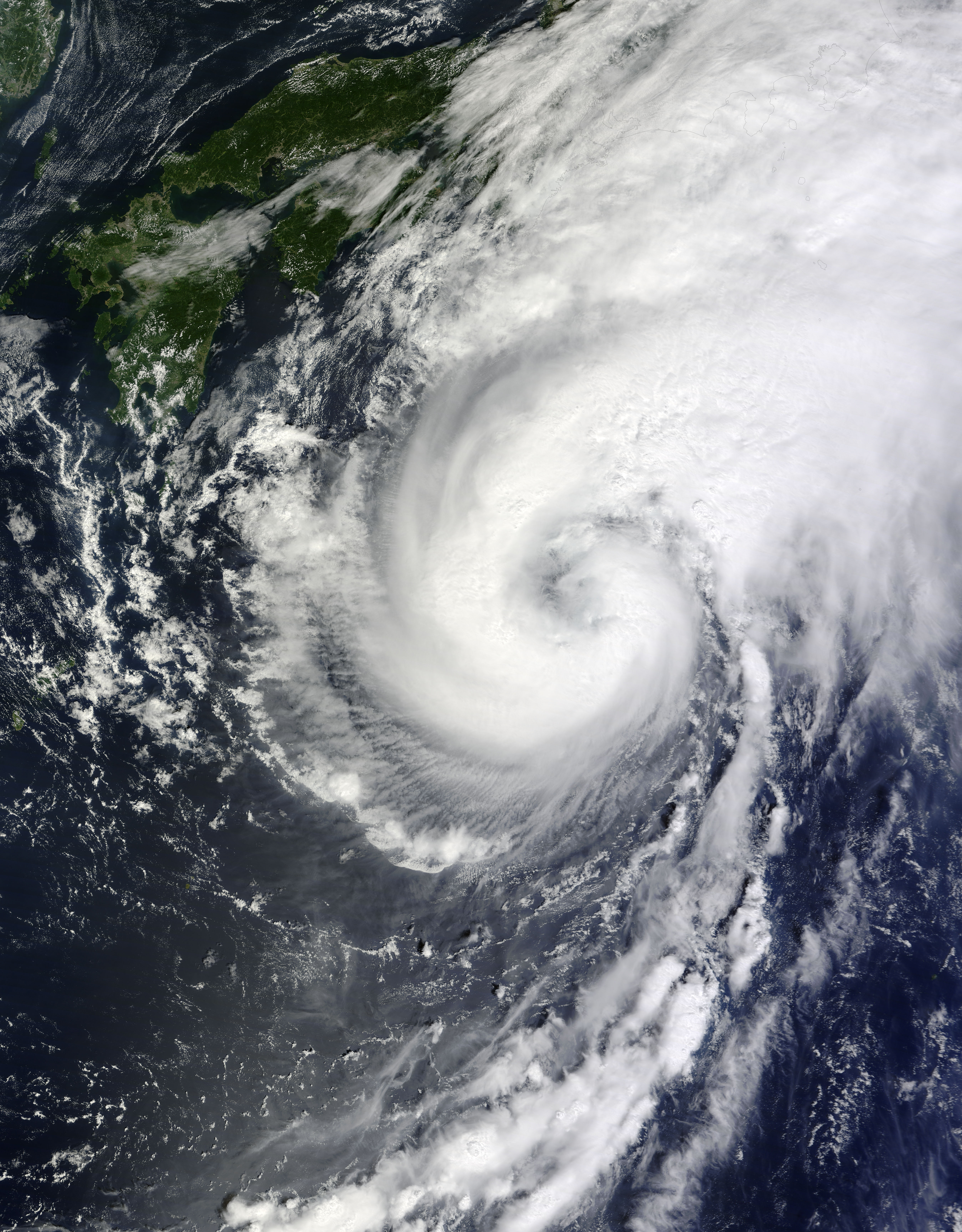
Severe Tropical Storm Fengshen at peak intensity on September 8

- 00:00 UTC — The JTWC made their final warning on Tropical Depression 14W (Karding), as it makes landfall over Southern China.
- 06:00 UTC — The JMA estimates that Severe Tropical Storm Fengshen has reached its peak intensity, with 10-minute sustained wind speeds of 110 km/h (70 mph).
- 12:00 UTC — The JMA stops monitoring Tropical Depression Karding.

September 10

- 18:00 UTC — The JTWC reports that Tropical Depression 15W has developed about 335 km (210 mi) to the east of Yap.
- 18:00 UTC — The JMA reports that Severe Tropical Storm Fengshen has transitioned into an extratropical cyclone.

September 11

- 06:00 UTC — The JMA reports that the extra tropical remnants of Severe Tropical Storm Fengshen have dissipated to the east of Japan.
- 18:00 UTC — The JMA starts monitoring Tropical Depression 15W as a tropical depression.

September 12

- 06:00 UTC — The JMA reports that Tropical Depression 15W has intensified into a tropical storm and names it Kalmaegi.
- 09:00 UTC — PAGASA names Tropical Storm Kalmaegi: Luis, as the system enters its area of responsibility.

September 13

- 00:00 UTC — The JMA reports that Tropical Storm Kalmaegi has intensified into a severe tropical storm.
- 15:00 UTC — The JTWC upgrades Kalmaegi to a Category 1 typhoon.
- 18:00 UTC — The JMA reports that Severe Tropical Storm Kalmaegi has intensified into a typhoon.

September 14

- 12:00 UTC — Typhoon Kalmaegi makes landfall over Cagayan.
- 12:00 UTC — Due to land interaction, the JTWC downgrades the system to a tropical storm.

September 16

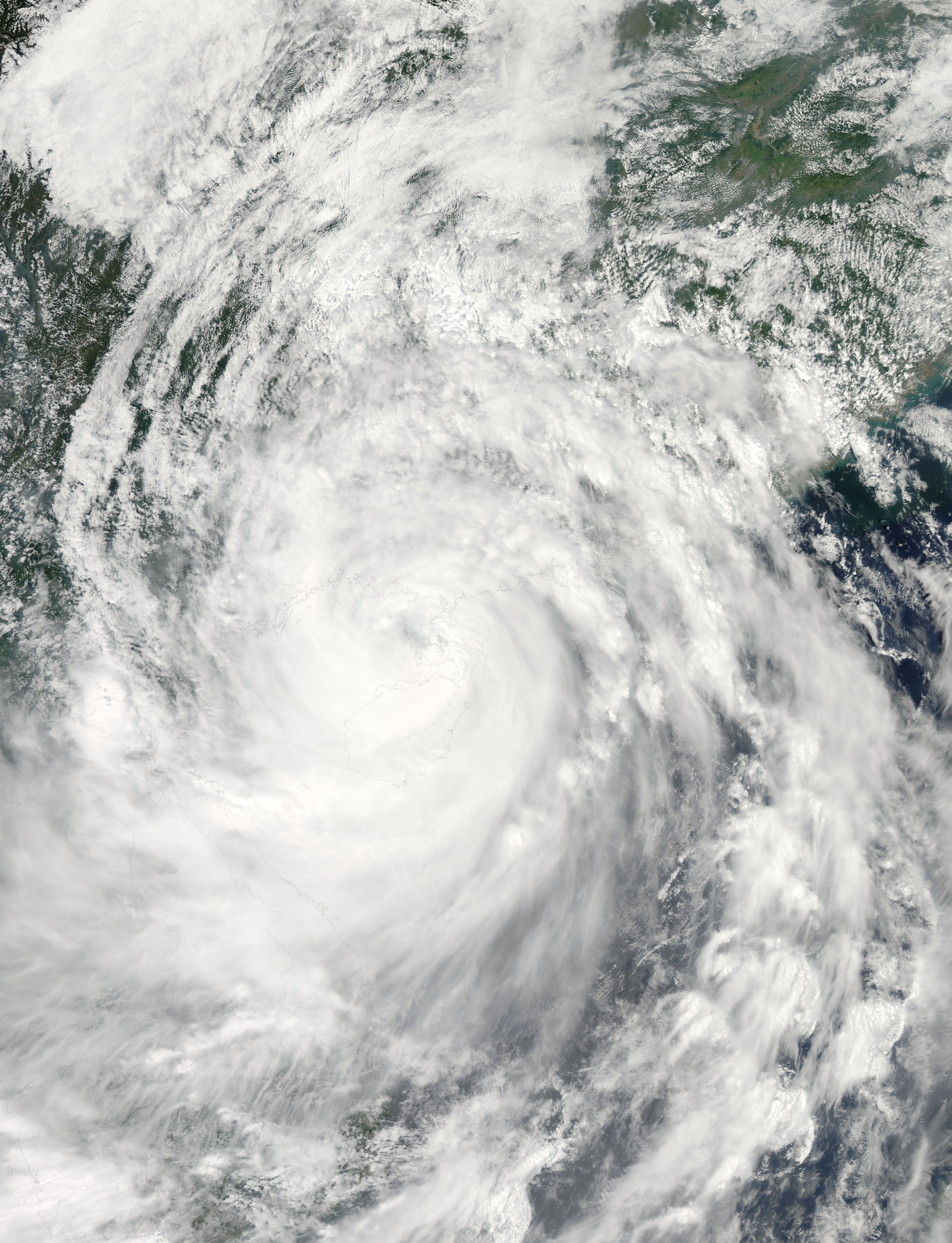
Kalmaegi nearing landfall on September 16

- 00:00 UTC — The JMA estimates that Typhoon Kalmaegi has reached its peak intensity of 75 knots.
- 01:40 UTC — Typhoon Kalmaegi makes landfall at Wenchang on the island of Hainan, before emerging into the Qiongzhou Strait.
- 04:45 UTC — Typhoon Kalmaegi makes landfall at Xuwen County in the Chinese province of Guangdong, before emerging into the Gulf of Tonkin.
- 15:00 UTC — Typhoon Kalmaegi makes landfall over the Vietnamese province of Quảng Ninh.
- 18:00 UTC — The JMA reports that Typhoon Kalmaegi has weakened into a severe tropical storm, while the system is located over the Vietnamese province of Lạng Sơn.
- 18:00 UTC — The JTWC reports that Typhoon Kalmaegi has weakened into a tropical storm and issues its final advisory on the system.

September 17

- 00:00 UTC — The JMA reports that a tropical depression has developed to the south-east of Manila, Philippines.
- 06:00 UTC — The JMA reports that Severe Tropical Storm Kalmaegi has weakened into a tropical storm, while the system is located over the Chinese province of Yunnan.
- 09:00 UTC — PAGASA names the tropical depression: Mario.
- 12:00 UTC — The JTWC begins issuing warnings on the system and designates it as Tropical Depression 16W.
- 12:00 UTC — The JMA reports that the tropical depression has intensified into Tropical Storm Fung-wong.
- 12:00 UTC — The JMA reports that Tropical Storm Kalmaegi has weakened into a tropical depression over the Laotian province of Phongsaly.

September 18

- 00:00 UTC — The JMA reports that Tropical Depression Kalmaegi, has dissipated over the Burmese state of Shan.
- 18:00 UTC — The JMA estimates that Tropical Storm Fung-wong has reached its peak intensity, with 10-minute sustained windspeeds of 85 km/h (50 mph).

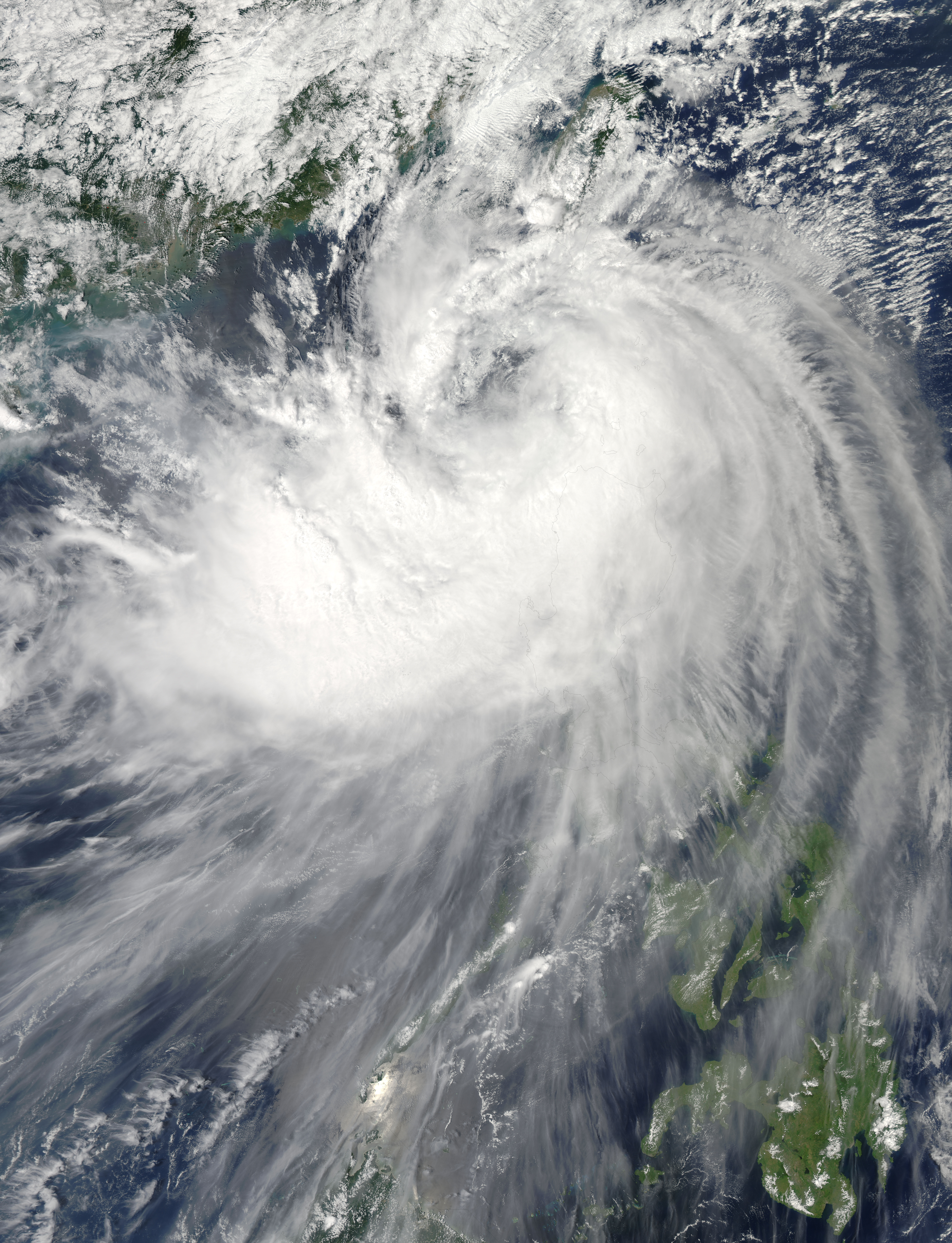
Tropical Storm Fung-wong at peak intensity on September 20

September 22

- 12:00 UTC — The JMA reports that a tropical depression has developed, about 800 km (495 mi) to the northeast of Hagåtña, Guam.

September 24

- 00:00 UTC — The JMA reports that Tropical Storm Fung-wong has transitioned into an extratropical cyclone.
- 12:00 UTC — The JTWC initiates advisories on the tropical depression and assigns it the designation 17W.
- 12:00 UTC — The JMA reports that Tropical Depression 17W has intensified into a tropical storm and names it Kammuri.

September 25

- 06:00 UTC — The JMA reports that the extratropical remnants of Tropical Storm Fung-wong have dissipated over Japan.
- 12:00 UTC — The JTWC reports that Tropical Depression Kammuri has intensified into a tropical storm.

September 26

- 12:00 UTC — The JMA reports that Tropical Storm Kammuri has intensified into a severe tropical storm, as the system reached its peak intensity with 10-minute sustained wind speeds of 95 km/h (60 mph).

September 27

- 12:00 UTC — The JMA reports that Severe Tropical Storm Kammuri has weakened into a tropical storm.

September 28

- 06:00 UTC — The JMA reports that a tropical depression has developed about 480 km (300 mi) to the northeast of Palikir on the Micronesian island of Pohnpei.
- 12:00 UTC — The area of convection intensifies into Tropical Depression 18W.

September 29

- 06:00 UTC — The JMA reports that Tropical Depression 18W has intensified into tropical storm and names it Phanfone.
- 12:00 UTC — The JTWC made their last advisory on Kammuri.

September 30

- 00:00 UTC — The JMA reports that Tropical Storm Kammuri, has transitioned into an extratropical cyclone.
- 12:00 UTC — The JMA reports that Tropical Storm Phanfone has intensified into a severe tropical storm.

=== October ===
October 1

- 03:00 UTC — The JTWC upgrades Phanfone to a typhoon.
- 06:00 UTC — The JMA reports that Severe Tropical Storm Phanfone has intensified into a typhoon.
- 18:00 UTC — The JMA stops monitoring the extratropical remnants of Severe Tropical Storm Kammuri, as they have moved across the International Dateline into the Eastern Pacific Ocean.

October 2

- 03:00 UTC — Phanfone intensifies into a Category 3 typhoon.
- 06:00 UTC — The JMA reports that Typhoon Phanfone has reached its peak intensity, with 10-minute sustained windspeeds of 175 km/h (110 mph).
- 12:00 UTC — The JMA reports that a tropical depression has developed about 400 km (250 mi) to the east of Pohnpei.
- 09:00 UTC — The JTWC upgrades Phanfone to Category 4 typhoon.
- 15:00 UTC — Phanfone weakens into a Category 3 typhoon.
- 21:00 UTC — The JTWC designates the tropical depression as Tropical Depression 19W.

October 3

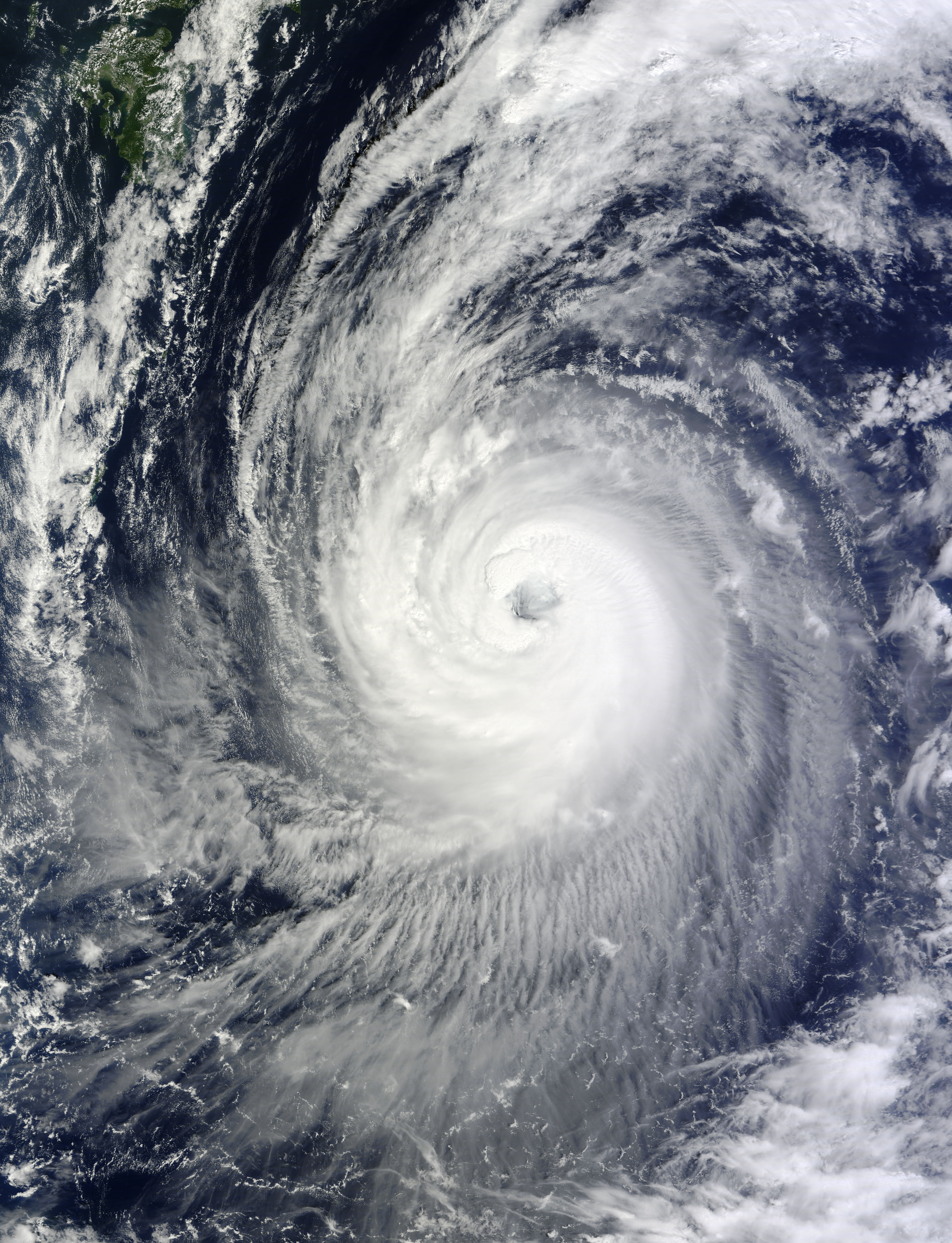
Phanfone with a minor eyewall replacement cycle on October 3

- 00:00 UTC — PAGASA starts issuing warnings on Phanfone and named it Neneng.
- 12:00 UTC — The JMA names Tropical Depression 19W; Vongfong.
- 18:00 UTC — The JMA reports that Tropical Depression Vongfong has intensified into a tropical storm.
- 21:00 UTC — The JTWC upgrades Phanfone to a Category 4 typhoon again.

October 4

- 03:00 UTC — Phanfone intensifies into a Category 4 super typhoon.
- 09:00 UTC — Vongfong was upgraded to a Category 1 typhoon by the JTWC.
- 12:00 UTC — The JMA reports that Tropical Storm Vongfong has intensified into a severe tropical storm.
- 15:00 UTC — Phanfone was downgraded to a Category 3 typhoon by the JTWC.

October 5

- 09:00 UTC — Phanfone weakens to a Category 2 typhoon.
- In the same time, the JTWC upgrades Vongfong to a Category 2 typhoon.

October 6

- 06:00 UTC — The JMA reports that Typhoon Phanfone has weakened into a severe tropical storm.
- 09:00 UTC — The JTWC issues their final advisory on Phanfone, as it transitions into an extratropical cyclone.
- 12:00 UTC — The JMA reports that Typhoon Phanfone has transitioned into an extratropical cyclone.

October 7

- 03:00 UTC — The JTWC reports that Typhoon Vongfong has intensified and become equivalent to a Category 3 typhoon on the SSHWS.
- 06:00 UTC — PAGASA names Vongfong: Ompong, as it enters their area of responsibility.
- 06:00 UTC — The JTWC reports that Typhoon Vongfong has intensified and become equivalent to a Category 4 typhoon on the SSHWS.
- 12:00 UTC — The JTWC reports that Typhoon Vongfong has intensified and become equivalent to a Category 4 super typhoon on the SSHWS.
- 18:00 UTC — The JMA reports that Typhoon Vongfong has reached its peak intensity with 10-minute sustained wind speeds of 215 km/h (130 mph).
- 18:00 UTC — The JTWC reports that Typhoon Vongfong has intensified and become equivalent to a Category 5 super typhoon on the SSHWS.

October 8

- 00:00 UTC — The JMA stops monitoring the extratropical remnants of Typhoon Phanfone, as they have moved across the International Dateline into the Eastern Pacific Ocean.

October 9

06:00 UTC — The JTWC reports that Typhoon Vongfong has weakened and become equivalent to a Category 4 super typhoon on the SSHWS.

October 10

06:00 UTC — The JTWC reports that Typhoon Vongfong has weakened and become equivalent to a Category 4 typhoon on the SSHWS.

- 18:00 UTC — The JTWC reports that Typhoon Vongfong has weakened and become equivalent to a Category 3 typhoon on the SSHWS.

October 11

- 06:00 UTC — The JTWC reports that Typhoon Vongfong has weakened and become equivalent to a Category 2 typhoon on the SSHWS.
- 12:00 UTC — The JTWC reports that Typhoon Vongfong has weakened and become equivalent to a Category 1 typhoon on the SSHWS.

October 12

- 03:00 UTC — The JTWC reports that Typhoon Vongfong has weakened into a tropical storm.

October 13

- 00:00 UTC — The JMA reports that Typhoon Vongfong has weakened into a severe tropical storm, while located over the Japanese island of Kyushu.
- 06:00 UTC — The JMA reports that Severe Tropical Storm Vongfong has made landfall on the Japanese island of Shikoku.
- 12:00 UTC — The JMA reports that Severe Tropical Storm Vongfong has made landfall on the Japanese island of Honshu.

October 14

- 00:00 UTC — The JMA reports that Severe Tropical Storm Vongfong has transitioned into an extratropical cyclone as it emerges into the Pacific Ocean.

October 16

- 12:00 UTC — The JMA stops monitoring the extratropical remnants of Typhoon Vongfong, as they have moved across the International Dateline into the Eastern Pacific Ocean.

October 30

- 00:00 UTC — The JMA reports that a tropical depression has developed about 2,160 km (1,340 mi) to the southeast of Manila, Philippines.

October 31

- 00:00 UTC — The JTWC initiates advisories on the tropical depression and assigns it the designation 20W.
- 00:00 UTC — The JMA reports that Tropical Depression 20W has intensified into a tropical storm.
- 06:00 UTC — The JMA names Tropical Depression 20W: Nuri.
- 12:00 UTC — The JTWC reports that Tropical Depression Nuri has intensified into a tropical storm.
- 12:00 UTC — PAGASA names Tropical Storm Nuri: Paeng, as the system enters the Philippine area of responsibility.

=== November ===
November 1

- 00:00 UTC — The JMA reports that Tropical Storm Nuri has intensified into a severe tropical storm.
- 12:00 UTC — The JMA reports that Severe Tropical Storm Nuri has intensified into a typhoon.
- 18:00 UTC — The JTWC reports that Tropical Storm Nuri has intensified and become equivalent to a Category 1 typhoon on the SSHWS.

November 2

- 00:00 UTC — The JTWC reports that Typhoon Nuri has intensified and become equivalent to a Category 2 typhoon on the SSHWS.
- 06:00 UTC — The JTWC reports that Typhoon Nuri has intensified and become equivalent to a Category 4 typhoon on the SSHWS.
- 12:00 UTC — The JMA reports that Typhoon Nuri has reached its peak intensity with 10-minute sustained wind speeds of 285 km/h (180 mph).
- 12:00 UTC — The JTWC reports that Typhoon Nuri has intensified and become a super typhoon.
- 18:00 UTC — The JTWC reports that Super Typhoon Nuri has intensified and become equivalent to a Category 5 typhoon on the SSHWS. At the same time they report that the system has reached its peak intensity with 1-minute sustained wind speeds of 285 km/h (180 mph).

November 4

- 00:00 UTC — The JTWC reports that Super Typhoon Nuri has weakened and become equivalent to a Category 4 typhoon on the SSHWS.
- 06:00 UTC — The JTWC reports that Super Typhoon Nuri has weakened into a typhoon.
- 18:00 UTC — The JTWC reports that Typhoon Nuri has weakened and become equivalent to a Category 3 typhoon on the SSHWS.

November 5

- 06:00 UTC — The JTWC reports that Typhoon Nuri has weakened and become equivalent to a Category 2 typhoon on the SSHWS.
- 12:00 UTC — The JTWC reports that Typhoon Nuri has weakened and become equivalent to a Category 1 typhoon on the SSHWS.
- 18:00 UTC — The JMA reports that Typhoon Nuri has weakened into a severe tropical storm.

November 6

- 00:00 UTC — The JTWC issues its final advisory on Typhoon Nuri as it has weakened into a tropical storm and transitioned into an extratropical cyclone.
- 18:00 UTC — The JMA reports that Severe Tropical Storm Nuri has transitioned into an extratropical cyclone.

November 7

- 12:00 UTC — The JMA reports that the extratropical remnants of Typhoon Nuri have dissipated.

November 25

- 23:00 UTC — PAGASA reports that a tropical depression has developed about 260 km (160 mi) to the east of Hinatuan, Surigao del Sur on the Philippine Island of Mindanao and names it Queenie.

November 26

- 00:00 UTC — The JMA starts to monitor Tropical Depression Queenie.
- 06:00 UTC — The JTWC initiates advisories on Tropical Depression Queenie and assigns it the designation 21W.
- 10:00 UTC — Tropical Depression 21W (Queenie) makes landfall on the Philippine island of Mindanao, in the vicinity of Tandag, Surigao del Sur.

November 28

- 00:00 UTC — The JMA reports that Tropical Depression Queenie has intensified into a tropical storm and names it Sinlaku as it moves through the Spratly Islands.
- 03:00 UTC — The JTWC upgrades Sinlaku to a tropical storm.
- 12:00 UTC — PAGASA releases its final advisory on Sinlaku (Queenie) as it exits their area of responsibility.

November 30

- 03:00 UTC — The JTWC stops issuing advisories on Sinlaku.
- 06:00 UTC — The JMA reports that Tropical Storm Sinlaku (Queenie) has weakened into a tropical depression.
- 12:00 UTC — The JMA reports that Tropical Depression Sinlaku (Queenie) has dissipated over Vietnam.
- 12:00 UTC — The JMA reports that a Tropical Depression has developed about 500 km (310 mi) to the southwest of Palikir on the Micronesian island of Pohnpei.

=== December ===
December 1

- 00:00 UTC — The JMA reports that the tropical depression has developed into a tropical storm, while the JTWC classifies the system as Tropical Depression 22W.
- 06:00 UTC — The JTWC reports that Tropical Depression 22W has intensified into a tropical storm while the JMA named it: Hagupit.

December 2

- 18:00 UTC — Hagupit intensifies into a minimal typhoon.

December 3

- 18:00 UTC — Typhoon Hagupit enters the PAR and PAGASA names the storm: Ruby.
- 21:00 UTC — Hagupit intensifies into a Category 5 super typhoon.

December 27

- 21:00 UTC — PAGASA reports that Tropical Depression Seniang has developed about 450 km (280 mi) to the northeast of Davao City on the Philippine island of Mindanao.

December 28

- 00:00 UTC — The JMA and JTWC start to monitor Tropical Depression Seniang.
- 12:00 UTC — The JMA reports that Tropical Depression Seniang has intensified into a tropical storm.
- 21:00 UTC — The JTWC upgrades Seniang to a tropical storm.

December 29

- 00:00 UTC — According to the JMA, Seniang intensifies into Tropical Storm Jangmi.
- 18:00 UTC — The JMA reports that Tropical Storm Jangmi (Seniang) has reached its peak intensity, with 10-minute sustained windspeeds of 40 kts.

December 30

- 12:00 UTC — The JMA reports that Tropical Storm Jangmi (Seniang) has weakened into a tropical depression.

January 1, 2015

- 12:00 UTC — Tropical Depression Jangmi (Seniang) makes landfall in the Malaysian state of Sabah on the island of Borneo.
- 18:00 UTC — The JMA reports that Tropical Depression Jangmi (Seniang) has dissipated over the Malaysian state of Sabah on the island of Borneo.

== See also ==
- Timeline of the 2014 Pacific hurricane season
- Timeline of the 2014 Atlantic hurricane season
