= Hurricane Cristobal =

Category 1 Atlantic hurricane in 2014

- Cristobal near peak intensity off the U.S. East Coast on August 28

Meteorological history
- Formed: August 23, 2014
- Extratropical: August 29, 2014
- Dissipated: September 2, 2014

Category 1 hurricane
- 1-minute sustained (SSHWS/NWS)
- Highest winds: 85 mph (140 km/h)
- Lowest pressure: 965 mbar (hPa); 28.50 inHg

Overall effects
- Fatalities: 7
- Damage: Unknown
- Areas affected: Puerto Rico, Hispaniola, Turks and Caicos Islands, East Coast of the United States, Bermuda, Iceland
- IBTrACS
- Part of the 2014 Atlantic hurricane season

Hurricane Cristobal was a moderately strong Atlantic tropical cyclone that affected multiple landmasses from Puerto Rico to Iceland in late August and early September 2014. Slow to develop and inhibited by unfavorable wind shear for most of its duration, the storm formed on August 23 near the Caicos Islands from a long-tracked tropical wave. Moving generally northward, Cristobal gradually intensified despite a ragged appearance on satellite imagery, and passed midway between Bermuda and North Carolina on August 27. The next day, while accelerating northeast, Cristobal achieved its peak strength as a Category 1 hurricane. A colder environment transitioned Cristobal into an extratropical cyclone on August 29, but it retained much of its strength as it sped across the northern Atlantic and struck Iceland on September 1.

Before its classification as a tropical cyclone, the disturbance that would become Cristobal dropped heavy rain over Puerto Rico, locally reaching 13.21 in (336 mm). Widespread flooding and scattered landslides affected the territory, with 19 large rivers exceeding minor flood stage. The system went on to douse the island of Hispaniola with torrential rain, leading to at least four drowning deaths in Haiti and the Dominican Republic. Floodwaters damaged or destroyed over 800 houses and temporarily isolated 23 communities in the Dominican Republic, while about 640 families were displaced in Haiti. Another person was killed by floodwaters in the Turks and Caicos. The hurricane generated strong surf and dangerous rip currents along the U.S. East Coast, killing two swimmers in Maryland and New Jersey and leading to many lifeguard rescues. Later, the extratropical remnants of Cristobal buffeted Iceland with heavy rain and gusty winds, causing flooding around the capital city of Reykjavík.

== Meteorological history ==
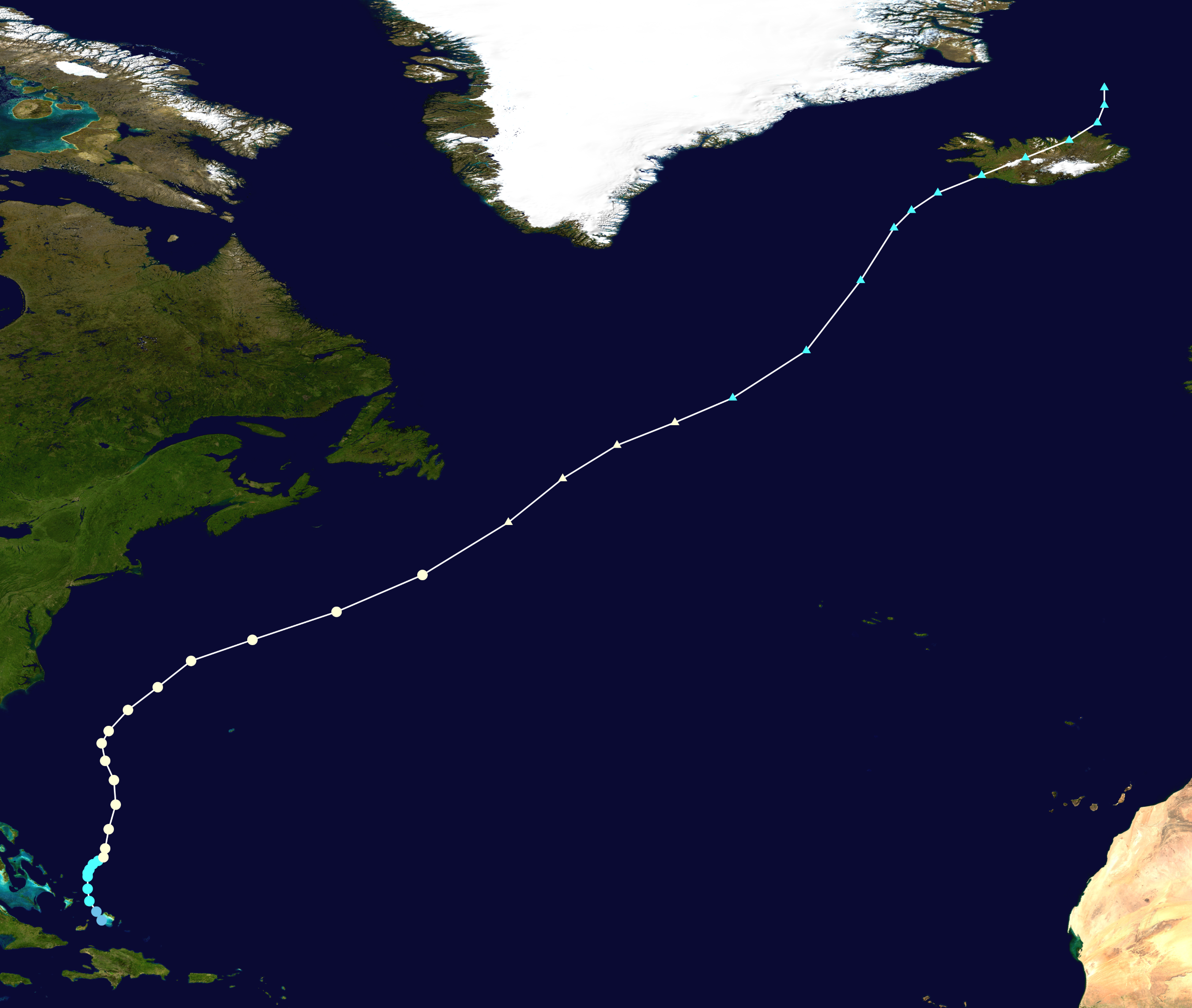
Map plotting the storm's track and intensity, according to the Saffir–Simpson scale Map key Saffir–Simpson scale Tropical depression (≤38 mph, ≤62 km/h) Tropical storm (39–73 mph, 63–118 km/h) Category 1 (74–95 mph, 119–153 km/h) Category 2 (96–110 mph, 154–177 km/h) Category 3 (111–129 mph, 178–208 km/h) Category 4 (130–156 mph, 209–251 km/h) Category 5 (≥157 mph, ≥252 km/h) Unknown Storm type Tropical cyclone Subtropical cyclone Extratropical cyclone, remnant low, tropical disturbance, or monsoon depression

Hurricane Cristobal originated from a westward-tracking tropical wave which emerged from the western coast of Africa on August 14, accompanied for several days by an expanse of clouds. Some cyclonic turning was evident as the disturbance approached the Leeward Islands by August 21, but a Hurricane Hunters flight tasked with investigating the system did not reveal a strong circulation at the surface. The system failed to consolidate as it traversed Puerto Rico and Hispaniola, but on August 23, further reconnaissance data confirmed the formation of a tropical depression just south of the Caicos Islands. The nascent cyclone slowly moved north-northwestward toward a weakness in the subtropical ridge. Moderate wind shear in the area kept convection over the depression disorganized and outflow limited, and the storm only gradually intensified. The depression strengthened into Tropical Storm Cristobal at 06:00 UTC on August 24, while located just north of Mayaguana in the Bahamas, but its structure was vertically tilted and suboptimally broad.

Weak steering currents kept Cristobal's forward motion slow and erratic, and the storm remained heavily affected by shear, with most deep convection displaced from the center. On August 25, the system turned toward the north-northeast in response to a mid-level trough to the north. Despite a ragged cloud pattern characterized by an exposed low-level center and a distinct lack of banding features, Cristobal intensified into a Category 1 hurricane at 00:00 UTC on August 26, as indicated by aircraft observations. The newly upgraded hurricane headed along a general northward path, and for the next couple days, pockets of dry air kept prevented further intensification. Convection fluctuated in intensity and coverage, and early on August 27 the National Hurricane Center remarked that "the satellite presentation resembles a subtropical cyclone". However, later that same day, the hurricane showed signs of increased development while located midway between Bermuda and Cape Hatteras, North Carolina. In particular, its cloud pattern became much more symmetric, and some cloud tops cooled to –70 °C (–95 °F). Around the same time, Cristobal accelerated toward the northeast as it became embedded within the mid-latitude westerlies ahead of an advancing shortwave trough.

An area of relatively warm cloud tops at the center of a central dense overcast gave way to an eye feature evident on visible satellite imagery on August 28. Rapidly gaining latitude, Cristobal reached its peak intensity at 18:00 UTC, with winds of 85 mph (140 km/h), roughly 490 mi (790 km) due south of Halifax, Nova Scotia. Shortly thereafter, the hurricane began to degrade as it moved over significantly colder waters and began to encounter further dry air, signalling the beginning of its transition to an extratropical cyclone. Cristobal's circulation soon began to interact with a frontal boundary, and deep convection became distanced well to the north of the center. Consequently, the hurricane lost its tropical identity by 12:00 UTC on August 29, just north of 44°N. Baroclinic processes preserved much of the extratropical cyclone's intensity, allowing it to maintain hurricane-force winds until August 30. Speeding generally northeastward, the storm slowly weakened over the northern Atlantic, making landfall on Iceland on September 1. Cristobal merged with another storm system north of the country by the next day.

== Impact ==
=== Antilles ===
Satellite image of the pre-Cristobal disturbance over Puerto Rico and Hispaniola on August 22

As Cristobal's parent wave moved over Puerto Rico, it engaged with an abnormally moist air mass to produce torrential rain totaling more than 10 in (250 mm). The highest rainfall totals were enhanced by orographic lift over mountainous terrain. A rain gauge near Tibes recorded a peak total of 13.21 in (336 mm), the majority of which fell on August 24. Luis Muñoz Marín International Airport near San Juan reported 5.52 in (140 mm) of precipitation. In total, 19 rivers reached minor flood stage and five reached moderate flood stage; some of them inundated adjacent roadways and urban areas. The heavy rainfall triggered multiple landslides, at least one of which forced a family to evacuate. The floods cut electricity to nearly 17,000 customers and left 7,000 without clean drinking water after putting some 18 filtration plants out of service. In some cases, however, the rain proved beneficial, refilling reservoirs after an abnormally dry summer. Only the northwestern corner of Puerto Rico escaped hydrological issues. Gusty winds caused minor damage to trees and tree branches in the territory. Moderate to heavy rainfall also affected the U.S. Virgin Islands, amounting to 5.27 in (134 mm) on Saint Thomas and 2.22 in (56 mm) on Saint Croix.

The island of Hispaniola also received damaging rainfall from the slow-moving storm. La Romana, Dominican Republic, recorded 5.04 in (128 mm) of rain in 24 hours on August 23 and 24, the result being destructive flooding. The floods isolated 23 towns from the outside world and damaged or destroyed more than 800 dwellings, especially in eastern and northeastern parts of the nation. Just over 4,100 individuals were forced to evacuate their homes. In Santo Domingo Province, three people required rescue from their car after trying to cross the swollen Isabela River. Two people were killed in the Dominican Republic, one of them after attempting to drive across a flooded river in the Hato Mayor Province. In neighboring Haiti, flooding totally destroyed four homes and heavily damaged 28 others, with a total of about 640 families left temporarily homeless. At least two people in the country were swept away by rushing waters, and many others sustained injuries.

Shortly after the storm's genesis, tropical storm warnings were issued for the central and southeastern Bahamas and the Turks and Caicos Islands. The advisories were discontinued by August 25. Heavy rain fell over the region, reaching 10.9 in (280 mm) on the island of Providenciales, where one person drowned in the ensuing floods. Floodwaters on North Caicos ran 5 ft (1.5 m) deep, blocking access to some communities. Governor Peter Beckingham reported "extensive damage to peoples' property and possessions" throughout the overseas territory.

=== Elsewhere ===
A tropical storm watch was issued for Bermuda on August 25, and ultimately discontinued about three days later. Two cruise ships left Bermuda early to avoid the storm, and another two postponed their scheduled stops there. The threat of the storm, combined with a lack of passengers due to cruise ship diversions, resulted in the suspension of ferry service. Cristobal ultimately passed well to the northwest of the island, producing breezy conditions and heightened surf.

The offshore hurricane lashed the East Coast of the United States with high swells and rip currents, prompting widespread swimming restrictions and bans. A teenaged male Virginia resident died in a drowning incident at Ocean City, Maryland, less than an hour after lifeguards went off-duty. In a 24-hour period, the Ocean City Beach Patrol rescued about 120 people caught in rip currents. Just off the coast, the rough seas capsized a 17 ft (5.2 m) boat, forcing the Coast Guard to rescue its three occupants. Another young male drowned at Sandy Hook, New Jersey; a wave reportedly knocked him down in shallow water before a rip current pulled the inexperienced swimmer farther out. Dangerous swimming conditions extended north to New England beaches, leading to numerous lifeguard rescues.

In southern Iceland, the extratropical remnants of Cristobal produced gusty winds and heavy rainfall, leading to extensive flooding in the capital city of Reykjavík. The fire department there responded to 37 calls for flooded buildings. Reykjavík Airport and Keflavík International Airport recorded wind gusts to 58 mph (93 km/h) and 62 mph (100 km/h), respectively. The adverse conditions impeded aerial surveillance of the ongoing volcanic eruptions at Bárðarbunga.

== See also ==
- Lists of Atlantic hurricanes
- List of Bermuda hurricanes
- Timeline of the 2014 Atlantic hurricane season
