= Hurricane Bertha (2014) =

Category 1 Atlantic hurricane in 2014

- Bertha at peak intensity northeast of the Bahamas on August 4

Meteorological history
- Formed: August 1, 2014
- Extratropical: August 6, 2014
- Dissipated: August 16, 2014

Category 1 hurricane
- 1-minute sustained (SSHWS/NWS)
- Highest winds: 80 mph (130 km/h)
- Lowest pressure: 998 mbar (hPa); 29.47 inHg

Overall effects
- Fatalities: 4
- Damage: Minimal
- Areas affected: Lesser Antilles, Puerto Rico, Hispaniola, Cuba, Lucayan Archipelago, East Coast of the United States, Western Europe
- IBTrACS
- Part of the 2014 Atlantic hurricane season

Hurricane Bertha was an unusual tropical cyclone in early August 2014 that attained hurricane status, despite having a disheveled appearance and an abnormally high atmospheric pressure. The third tropical cyclone and second hurricane of the season, Bertha developed from a tropical wave south of Cape Verde was monitored first for possible tropical cyclogenesis on July 26. Over the following days, it slowly developed and acquired gale-force winds and enough convection to be designated as Tropical Storm Bertha early on August 1. A mostly disorganized cyclone, Bertha quickly moved across the Lesser Antilles, clipping the northern end of Martinique, later that day. During its trek across the eastern Caribbean Sea, its circulation became severely disrupted and it may have degenerated into a tropical wave. On August 3, it traversed the Mona Passage and moved over the Southeastern Bahamas where conditions favored development. Despite an overall ragged appearance on satellite imagery, data from Hurricane Hunters indicated it intensified to a hurricane on August 4; it acquired peak winds of 80 mph (130 km/h) that day. Turning north, and later northeast, Bertha soon weakened as it began to merge with an approaching trough to the west. This merger ultimately took place on August 6, at which time Bertha was declared extratropical well to the south of Nova Scotia. The remnant system raced eastward across the Atlantic and later struck the United Kingdom on August 10. Once over the North Sea, the storm stalled for a few days before resuming its eastward track. It was last noted around the Baltic Sea on August 16.

As a tropical cyclone, Bertha's impact was relatively minor. Widespread power outages occurred along its path but no major damage or loss of life took place on land. Enhanced swells and rip currents associated with the hurricane resulted in three fatalities and dozens of rescues along the East Coast of the United States. After becoming an extratropical system, it had significant effects in Western Europe. Particularly hard hit was the United Kingdom, where wind gusts reached 108 mph (174 km/h). Unseasonably heavy rains triggered widespread flooding which shut down roads and prompted evacuations. One fatality took place offshore. On mainland Europe, a small tornado outbreak resulted in scattered structural damage in Belgium, France, and Germany.

== Meteorological history ==
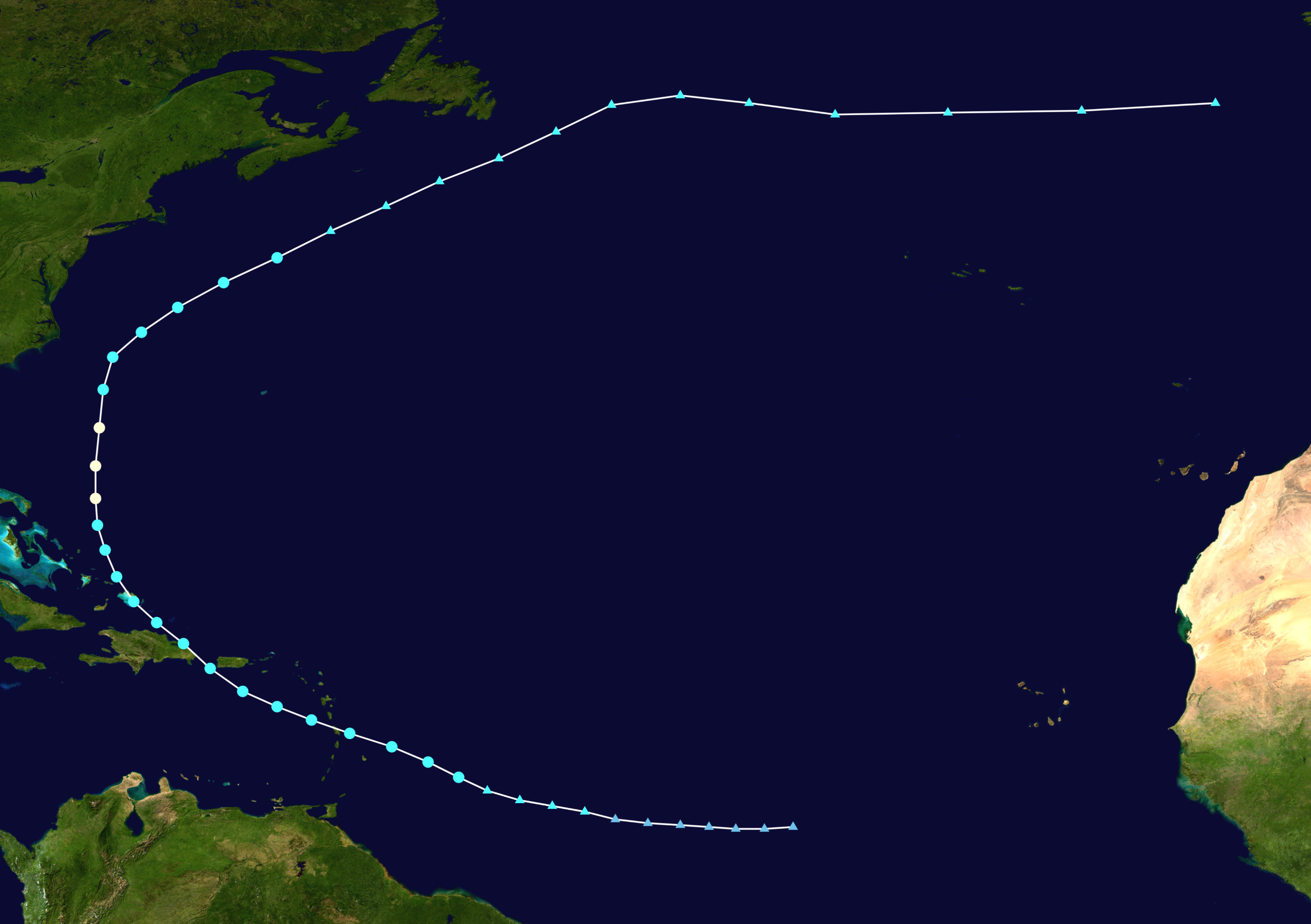
Map plotting the storm's track and intensity, according to the Saffir–Simpson scale Map key Saffir–Simpson scale Tropical depression (≤38 mph, ≤62 km/h) Tropical storm (39–73 mph, 63–118 km/h) Category 1 (74–95 mph, 119–153 km/h) Category 2 (96–110 mph, 154–177 km/h) Category 3 (111–129 mph, 178–208 km/h) Category 4 (130–156 mph, 209–251 km/h) Category 5 (≥157 mph, ≥252 km/h) Unknown Storm type Tropical cyclone Subtropical cyclone Extratropical cyclone, remnant low, tropical disturbance, or monsoon depression

On July 24, 2014, a westward moving tropical wave emerged off the west coast of Africa near the Cape Verde Islands. Following the development of convective activity —showers and thunderstorms— on July 26, National Hurricane Center (NHC) began monitoring the system for potential tropical cyclogenesis. A disorganized system, development was forecast to be slow due to unfavorable environmental conditions. Organization and coverage of convection began improving by July 28, due in part to the passage of a Kelvin wave. An area of low pressure subsequently consolidated within the disturbance on July 29 and the NHC assessed the system as having high chance of becoming a tropical depression. Convection soon diminished over the system, though its circulation remained well-defined. Moving west-northwest around the periphery of a strong subtropical ridge, the low acquired tropical storm-force winds early on July 31 but continued to lack convection. A hurricane hunter aircraft investigated the system that afternoon and found winds of 45 mph (72 km/h) north and northeast of the center. In the hours following the weather reconnaissance mission, a band of deep convection blossomed near the center, prompting the NHC to designate the system as Tropical Storm Bertha at 00:00 UTC on August 1. Upon its classification, Bertha was situated roughly 345 mi (555 km) east-southeast of Barbados in the Lesser Antilles.

Within hours of Bertha's designation on August 1, wind shear stemming from a trough over the central Atlantic displaced convection from the circulation center. Satellite imagery depicted a well-defined and vigorous circulation; however, observations from the hurricane hunters indicated a wind field more akin to a tropical wave. Around 21:00 UTC, Bertha clipped the northern end of Martinique with sustained winds of 50 mph (80 km/h). Persistent shear continued to take its toll on the cyclone as it entered the Caribbean Sea with aircraft data indicating no closed circulation at 5,000 ft (1,500 m) elevation. Despite this, observations from Martinique and Dominica indicated that there was some semblance of a surface circulation, and the NHC continued to monitor Bertha as a tropical storm. Throughout August 2, convection steadily increased in coverage and organization though the center of Bertha remained displaced from the strongest thunderstorms to the southwest. NEXRAD weather radar imagery from San Juan, Puerto Rico depicted a disorganized, possibly open circulation throughout the day. In light of this, NHC forecaster John Beven noted that the system could degenerate into an open wave around the time in reached Hispaniola later on August 2.

A disorganized Tropical Storm Bertha approaching Hispaniola on August 2; the convective cloud mass obscures Puerto Rico to the north.

Continued effects of dry air entrainment, shear, and land interaction further degraded Bertha's structure and late on August 2, "the system barely [qualified] as a tropical cyclone". Various data sources indicated no closed circulation by 21:00 UTC and it was noted that advisories could be discontinued, at least temporarily. Early on August 3, the disheveled storm moved through the Mona Passage and brushed the eastern coast of the Dominican Republic before emerging over the Atlantic Ocean. As the storm moved away from Hispaniola its movement became more northwesterly, following the edge of the subtropical ridge. Moving near the Turks and Caicos Islands, Bertha's circulation finally became better organized and banding features developing over its eastern periphery. At 14:00 UTC, Bertha made landfall on Middle Caicos Island with winds of 45 mph (72 km/h). Subsequent strengthening of upper-level outflow, decreased shear, increased mid-level humidity, and high sea surface temperatures enabled rapid intensification. Deep convection wrapped cyclonically into the storm and winds reached 65 mph (105 km/h) by 03:00 UTC on August 4. During the early part of August 4, structural organization began to degrade with convection becoming more limited in extent and banding features dissipating. The only factor aiding the storm was its well-defined outflow. However, despite the storm's ragged and weak appearance, observations from hurricane hunters indicated that it had intensified into a hurricane by 12:00 UTC. Bertha is estimated to have reached its peak intensity around this time with winds of 80 mph (130 km/h) and a barometric pressure of 998 mbar (hPa; 29.47 inHg). Additionally, by this time its movement had shifted to due north and with increased forward momentum.

Through the remainder of August 4 and into the early hours of August 5, Bertha maintained hurricane status with its atypical structure. At times, its circulation became exposed due to increasing wind shear. Acceleration to the north-northeast ahead of a trough off the East Coast of the United States ensued as the system weakened below hurricane intensity during the overnight of August 4–5. Steadily increasing wind shear kept the circulation center mostly devoid of thunderstorms, with periodic bursts of convection being quickly pushed away. The storm's motion became more northeasterly early on August 6 as it began to undergo an extratropical transition. An upper-level jet streak coupled with the system that morning, prompting convection to develop away from the storm's center. Bertha soon merged with the trough steering it northeast as it moved into the cold sector of the front, which extended from Nova Scotia to The Bahamas. The merger of these systems marked Bertha's transition into an extratropical system, at which time it was located 290 mi (470 km) south-southeast of Halifax, Nova Scotia. Slight intensification took place shortly thereafter with winds increasing to 60 mph (97 km/h) before weakening resumed. The system raced eastward across the Atlantic and ultimately degraded into a trough several hundred miles southwest of Ireland on August 9. Bertha's remnants struck the United Kingdom the following day and later moved over the North Sea. There, the storm stalled for a few days before resuming its eastward track. The decaying cyclone moved over Scandinavia on August 14 and was last noted on August 16 near the Baltic Sea.

== Preparations and impact ==
=== Caribbean ===
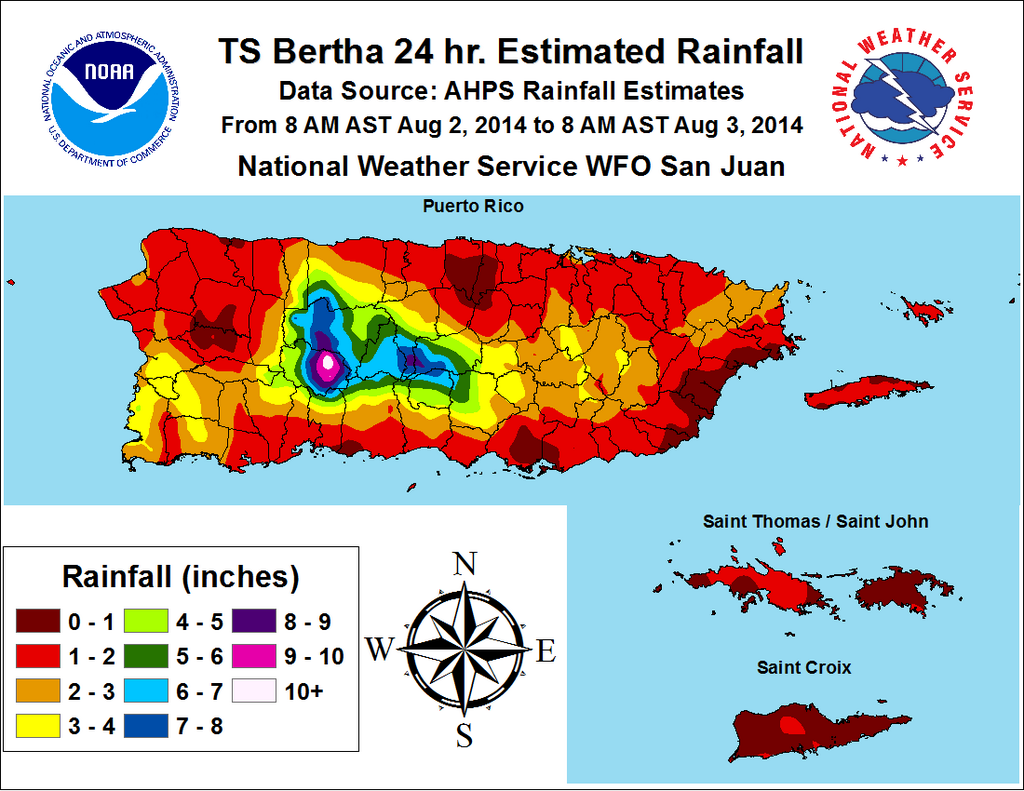
Map of rainfall estimates across Puerto Rico and the U.S. Virgin Islands from Tropical Storm Bertha in early August 2014.

Late on August 1, Bertha crossed the Lesser Antilles, bringing strong winds and heavy rain to many islands. Across Martinique, the storm produced sustained winds of 46 mph (74 km/h) with gusts to 54 mph (87 km/h). Numerous lightning strikes caused widespread surges in the electrical grid and left 150,000 residences without electricity. Power was restored to all customers by the evening of August 2. Rainfall was relatively light and less than anticipated with 1.2 to 2.4 in (30 to 60 mm) falling across northern areas of the island and 0.39 to 0.79 in (10 to 20 mm) over southern areas. Similar effects were felt in Guadeloupe where gusts reached 57 mph (92 km/h) on La Désirade. A general 3.9 to 5.9 in (100 to 150 mm) fell across Basse-Terre Island. Few reports of downed trees and power lines were received and overall damage was negligible. Some rain and wind also affected Barbados.

Dominica Prime Minister Roosevelt Skerrit declared a public holiday for the afternoon of August 1 in order for all workers to return home in advance of the storm. Several LIAT flights for the island and St. Lucia were canceled. Wind gusts on Dominica reached 43 mph (69 km/h) and hundreds of people lost power.

Coincidentally, Bertha threatened the United States Virgin Islands 18 years after a hurricane in 1996 of the same name, with both affecting the primary elections. Turnout was low as expected due to the storm, with 9,217 people (26.05 percent) of voters showing up to polls. In response to the storm, the Virgin Islands Territorial Emergency Management Agency was activated, leave for all police officers was suspended, and officers began operating on 12-hour shifts on August 1. The Public Works Department appropriated sandbags and cleared storm drains in anticipation of heavy rain. The outer edges of Bertha produced near-hurricane-force around the United States Virgin Islands, with an offshore buoy near St. Thomas measuring a gust of 72 mph (116 km/h). Gale-force winds on St. Croix snapped many tree limbs.

Infrared satellite loop of Bertha moving over the Turks and Caicos Islands on August 3

Across Puerto Rico, the outer bands of Bertha dropped a general 3 to 5 in (76 to 127 mm) of rain, with isolated areas reaching 10 in (250 mm), over areas suffering from a drought. Accumulations peaked at 11.11 in (282 mm) in Adjuntas. Some flooding occurred on the island, resulting in the partial collapse of two roads. The Río Grande de Arecibo topped its banks between highways 10 and 123 within the Utuado Municipality. Landslides blocked a few roads around Aceitunas. Tropical storm-force wind gusts, peaking at 52 mph (84 km/h), downed some trees and power lines. Prolific lightning accompanied the storm and resulted in 29,000 residences losing power. In Arroyo, 239 people, mostly athletes, sought refuge in public shelters.

Following the designation of Tropical Storm Bertha on August 1, the Ministry of Public Works and Communications in the Dominican Republic activated emergency operations to prepare for the storm. Several flights to and from Las Américas International Airport near Santo Domingo were canceled on August 2. Heavy rains in the country, peaking at 4.7 in (120 mm) in Bayaguana, caused significant flooding, especially along the Soco River which overflowed its banks. The communities of Atilano, Cabeza de Toro, Campiña, Concho Primo, and Lima, were temporarily isolated by the rising waters. Less substantial flooding occurred elsewhere in the country, with seven homes inundated in Moscú. Additionally, strong winds downed many trees in the region.

Across the Southeastern Bahamas, residents were warned of the approaching storm; however, many were preoccupied with a local regatta and ignored warnings. In the Turks and Caicos, locals brought their boats closer to shore and anchored them. Hotels were reportedly "taking seriously the threat of the storm." Increased surf and sporadic heavy rains associated with Bertha affected portions of Cuba.

=== United States East Coast ===
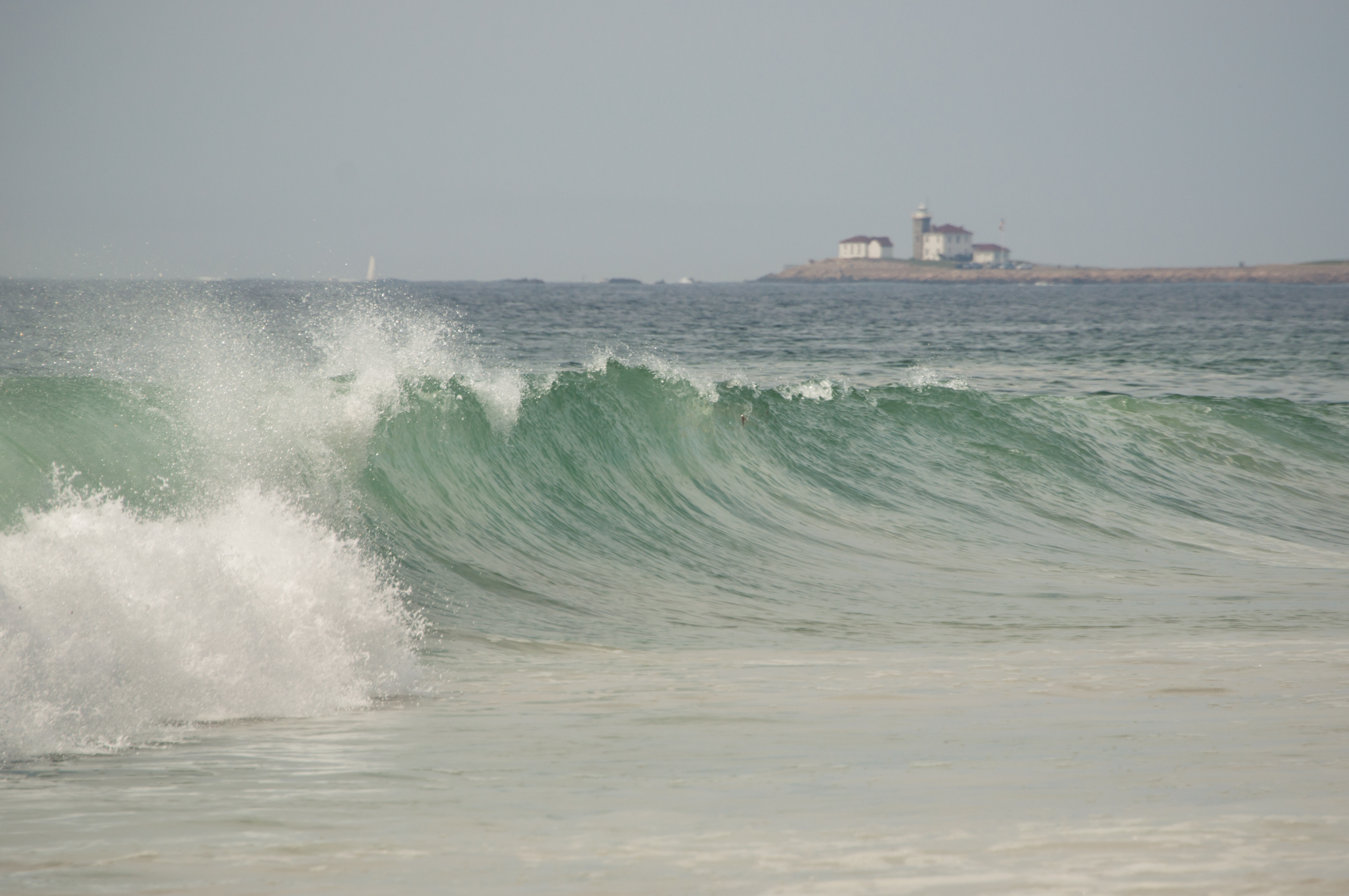
Enhanced surf at Misquamicut, Rhode Island due to Bertha

Though Bertha remained hundreds of miles offshore, long-period swells resulted in dangerous rip currents across the East Coast of the United States. Two people required rescue off the coast of Jacksonville, Florida due to rip currents. Lingering swells resulted in the drowning of a man at Mickler's Landing in Ponte Vedra Beach. Further north near Cape Hatteras, North Carolina, a man was pulled out to sea by rip currents and rescued by the Hatteras Island Rescue Squad; however, after being hospitalized he later succumbed to his injuries and died. Tropical storm warnings were raised for offshore zones; waves of 15 to 25 ft (4.6 to 7.6 m) were forecast for areas off the Delmarva Peninsula and New Jersey. Several people were injured in rough seas at Rehoboth Beach, Delaware while lifeguards performed multiple rescues. In Ocean City, New Jersey, 25 rescues took place on August 5. That same day, a woman nearly drowned near Atlantic City after being pulled out by rip currents.

=== Western Europe ===
Wettest tropical cyclones and their remnants in the United Kingdom Highest-known totals
Precipitation			Storm	Location	Ref.
Rank	mm	in	Storm	Location	Ref.
1	150.0	5.91	Bertha 2014	Inverness, Highland	
2	135.0	5.31	Charley 1986	Abergwyngregyn, Gwynedd	
3	130.0	5.12	Nadine 2012	Ravensworth, North Yorkshire	
4	76.0	2.99	Lili 1996	Chale Bay, Isle of Wight	
5	61.7	2.43	Zeta 2020	Chipping, Lancashire	
6	48.8	1.92	Grace 2009	Capel Curig, Conwy	
7	42.2	1.66	Gordon 2006	Wainfleet All Saints, Lincolnshire	
8	38.0	1.50	Gonzalo 2014	Glenmoriston, Highland	
9	31.0	1.22	Bill 2009	Shap, Cumbria	
10	30.0	1.18	Laura 2008	Windermere, Cumbria	

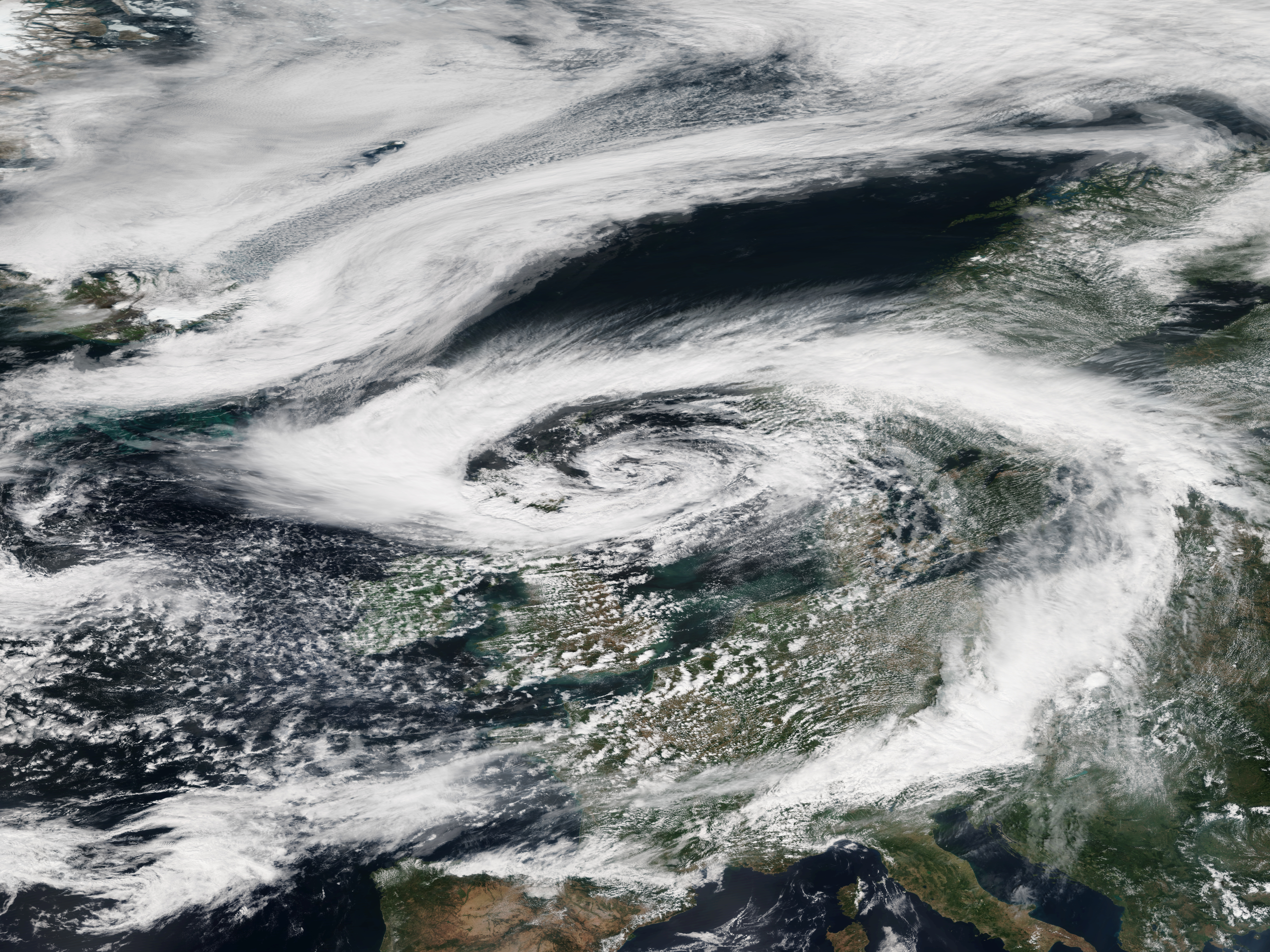
The extratropical remnant of Bertha over the North Sea, on August 11

Heavy rains from the remnant of Bertha caused widespread flooding across the United Kingdom. Flood warnings were issued for 6 regions across the nation while alerts were raised for a further 47 areas during the storm's passage. In London, a water main burst and inundated surrounding streets. Thirty shops were affected and nearby stations of the London Underground were swamped. The Prudential RideLondon race was shortened by 14 mi (23 km) due to the storm. The River Dee rose to its highest level since 1990 and flooded surrounding areas. Footbridges and paths along its banks were washed away, though no structures were affected. Lossiemouth, Scotland, received a month's worth of rain in roughly 12 hours. Flooding in Elgin prompted the evacuation of 200 homes. Numerous roads were washed out across Scotland and First ScotRail reported widespread service disruption. High winds and flooding also damaged crops across the region, namely in Scotland. A Gold Duke of Edinburgh expedition team from 1st Raffrey Boys' Brigade were forced to airlift a crew member to safety after sustaining injuries caused by severe weather conditions in the Mournes. The team of five, part of a larger group of thirty, required the assistance of a helicopter from Dublin to save the fallen traveller and winched him to safety. Although scarred, the team went on to complete the expedition in record time.

Offshore, a man suffered a fatal head injury on his yacht amid rough seas and high winds. The Solent Coastguards flew out to rescue the man, but he was declared dead on the scene. Twenty vessels competing in the 2014 EXE Sails GP14 World Championships were caught in high winds produced by the storm and capsized in the Strangford Lough. A nearby hospital declared a major incident and the coast guard rushed to rescue the 97 sailors stranded in the water. Only one person suffered injuries, but all were treated for hypothermia.

The outer bands of Bertha's remnants produced a prolonged period of severe weather over mainland Europe, extending from France to Sweden. In southwest Germany, gusts reached 75 mph (120 km/h). On August 10, a small tornado outbreak occurred with touchdowns taking place in Belgium, France, and Germany. The strongest of these, rated F2 on the Fujita Scale, affected Bad Schwalbach, Germany; 50 homes were damaged in the area and a swath of forest was heavily damaged. An F1 tornado struck an outdoor event in Luxembourg, Belgium, resulting in four serious injuries. Additionally, an EF1 storm traveled for 25 mi (41 km) through the Nord-Pas-de-Calais region of France. Another tornado, rated F0, touched down in Kingston upon Hull, United Kingdom, on the same day.

Alerts were raised across Norway for the potential of flooding and damaging winds.

== See also ==
- Other storms of the same name
- Timeline of the 2014 Atlantic hurricane season
- Tropical cyclone effects in Europe
  - Hurricane Katia (2011) – A strong hurricane whose extratropical remnants had significant impact in the Britain and Ireland
