= Timeline of the 2014 Atlantic hurricane season =

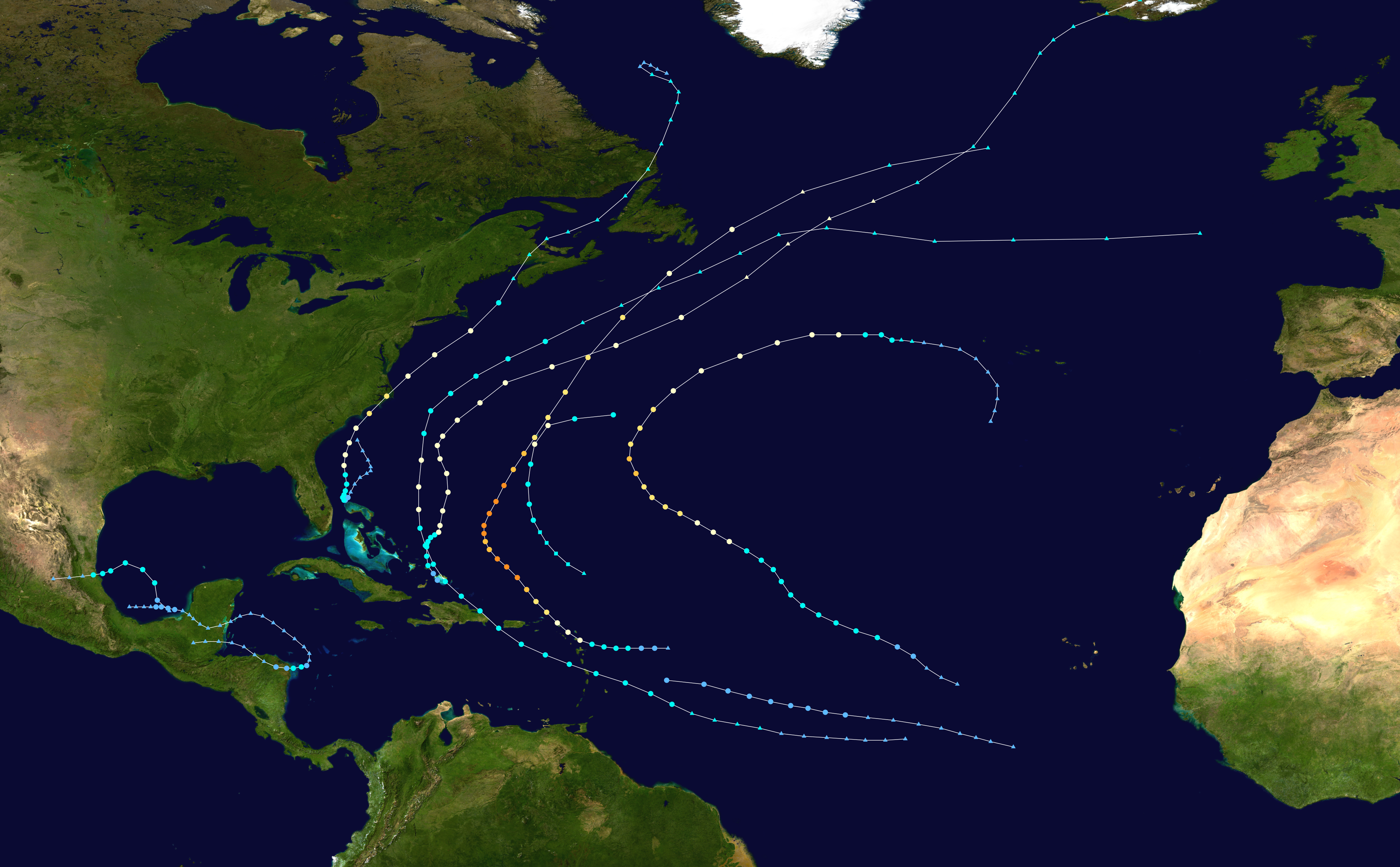
- Season summary map

Season boundaries
- First system formed: July 1, 2014
- Last system dissipated: October 28, 2014

Strongest system
- Name: Gonzalo
- Maximum winds: 145 mph (230 km/h) (1-minute sustained)
- Lowest pressure: 940 mbar (hPa; 27.76 inHg)

Longest lasting system
- Name: Edouard
- Duration: 8 days
Storm articles
- Hurricane Arthur
- Hurricane Bertha (2014)
- Hurricane Cristobal
- Tropical Storm Dolly (2014)
- Hurricane Fay
- Hurricane Gonzalo

The 2014 Atlantic hurricane season was an event in the annual hurricane season in the north Atlantic Ocean. It featured below-average tropical cyclone activity, (Note: An average Atlantic hurricane season, as defined by the National Oceanic and Atmospheric Administration, has 12 tropical storms, six hurricanes and two major hurricanes.) with the fewest named storms since the 1997 season. The season officially began on June 1, 2014 and ended on November 30, 2014. These dates, adopted by convention, historically describe the period in each year when most tropical systems form. The first system of the season, Hurricane Arthur, developed on July 1, and the last, Tropical Storm Hanna, dissipated on October 28.

Altogether, eight tropical storms formed during the season, including six hurricanes of which two intensified into major hurricanes. (Note: Hurricanes reaching Category 3 (111 mph / 178 km/h) and higher on the 5-level Saffir–Simpson wind speed scale are considered major hurricanes.) There was also one tropical depression that failed to reach tropical storm strength. Impact throughout the year was widespread. Arthur, which made landfall near Cape Lookout, North Carolina on July 3, with 100 mph (155 km/h) winds, was the strongest hurricane to strike the U.S. mainland since Hurricane Ike in 2008. In October, Bermuda was struck twice, as hurricanes Fay and Gonzalo made landfall only six days apart, October 12 and 18 respectively.

This timeline documents tropical cyclone formations, strengthening, weakening, landfalls, extratropical transitions, and dissipations during the season. It includes information that was not released throughout the season, meaning that data from post-storm reviews by the National Hurricane Center (NHC) has been included. The time stamp for each event is first stated using Coordinated Universal Time (UTC) the 24-hour clock where 00:00 equals midnight UTC. The NHC uses both UTC and the time zone where the center of the tropical cyclone is currently located. Time zones utilized (east to west) prior to 2020 were: Atlantic, Eastern, and Central. In this timeline, the respective area time is included in parentheses. Additionally, figures for maximum sustained winds and position estimates are rounded to the nearest 5 units (miles, or kilometers), following National Hurricane Center practice. Direct wind observations are rounded to the nearest whole number. Atmospheric pressures are listed to the nearest millibar and nearest hundredth of an inch of mercury.

== Timeline ==
=== June ===
- No tropical cyclones form in the Atlantic Ocean during the month of June.

June 1

- The 2014 Atlantic hurricane season officially begins.

=== July ===
July 1

- 00:00 UTC (8:00 p.m. EDT, June 30) near 27.7°N 78.9°W – Tropical Depression One develops from an area of low pressure about 80 mi (130 km) north of Freeport, Bahamas.
- 12:00 UTC (8:00 a.m. EDT) near 27.5°N 79.2°W – Tropical Depression One strengthens into Tropical Storm Arthur about 70 mi (110 km) east of Fort Pierce, Florida.

Hurricane Arthur nearing landfall in North Carolina on July 3

July 3

- 00:00 UTC (8:00 p.m. EDT, July 2) near 30.1°N 79.2°W – Tropical Storm Arthur strengthens into a Category 1 hurricane about 145 mi (230 km) east-southeast of Savannah, Georgia.

July 4

- 00:00 UTC (8:00 p.m. EDT, July 3) near 34.0°N 77.3°W – Hurricane Arthur intensifies into a Category 2 hurricane about 45 mi (70 km) east of Cape Fear, North Carolina.
- 03:15 UTC (11:15 p.m. EDT, July 3) near 34.7°N 76.6°W – Hurricane Arthur makes landfall on Shackleford Banks, about 5 mi (10 km) northwest of Cape Lookout, North Carolina, with winds of 100 mph (155 km/h).
- 06:00 UTC (2:00 a.m. EDT) near 35.3°N 76.0°W – Hurricane Arthur attains its peak intensity with maximum sustained winds of 100 mph (155 km/h) and a minimum barometric pressure of 973 mbar (28.73 inHg), while over Pamlico Sound.
- 08:00 UTC (4:00 a.m. EDT) near 35.8°N 75.5°W – Hurricane Arthur makes landfall on the Outer Banks, about 5 mi (10 km) north of Oregon Inlet, North Carolina, with winds of 100 mph (155 km/h).
- 12:00 UTC (8:00 a.m. EDT) near 36.8°N 74.4°W – Hurricane Arthur weakens to a Category 1 hurricane about 105 mi (165 km) east of Norfolk, Virginia.

July 5

- 06:00 UTC (2:00 a.m. EDT) near 42.3°N 67.6°W – Hurricane Arthur weakens to a tropical storm about 130 mi (215 km) east of Provincetown, Massachusetts.
- 12:00 UTC (8:00 a.m. EDT) near 44.1°N 66.5°W – Tropical Storm Arthur transitions into an extratropical cyclone about 25 mi (40 km) northwest of Yarmouth, Nova Scotia.

July 9

- 12:00 UTC (8:00 a.m. EDT) near 59.5°N 55.0°W – The extratropical cyclone formerly known as Arthur dissipates off the coast of Labrador.

July 21

- 12:00 UTC (8:00 a.m. AST) near 11.4°N 41.6°W – Tropical Depression Two develops from a tropical wave about 1,340 mi (2,160 km) east of the Lesser Antilles.

July 23

- 12:00 UTC (8:00 a.m. AST) near 14.0°N 55.0°W – Tropical Depression Two degenerates into an trough of low pressure about 385 mi (620 km) east of the Lesser Antilles, and dissipates.

=== August ===
August 1

- 00:00 UTC (8:00 p.m. AST, July 31) near 12.2°N 54.6°W – Tropical Storm Bertha develops from a tropical wave about 345 mi (555 km) east-southeast of Barbados.

August 3

- 14:00 UTC (10:00 a.m. AST) near 21.8°N 71.9°W – Tropical Storm Bertha makes landfall on Middle Caicos, Turks and Caicos Islands, with winds of 45 mph (75 km/h).

Hurricane Bertha northeast of the Bahamas on August 4

August 4

- 12:00 UTC (8:00 a.m. EDT) near 26.8°N 73.6°W – Tropical Storm Bertha strengthens into a Category 1 hurricane and simultaneously attains its peak intensity with maximum sustained winds of 80 mph (130 km/h) and a minimum barometric pressure of 998 mbar (29.47 inHg), about 195 mi (315 km) north-northeast of San Salvador Island, the Bahamas.

August 5

- 06:00 UTC (2:00 a.m. EDT) near 32.5°N 73.2°W – Hurricane Bertha weakens to a tropical storm about 585 mi (945 km) north-northeast of San Salvador Island.

August 6

- 18:00 UTC (2:00 p.m. AST) near 40.8°N 61.3°W – Tropical Storm Bertha transitions into an extratropical cyclone about 290 mi (465 km) south-southeast of Halifax, Nova Scotia.

August 9

- 12:00 UTC (8:00 a.m. AST) near 47.5°N 15.0°W – The extratropical cyclone formerly known as Bertha dissipates well southwest of Ireland.

August 23

- 18:00 UTC (2:00 p.m. AST) near 21.5°N 72.2°W – Tropical Depression Four develops from a tropical wave about 20 mi (35 km) south of Providenciales, Turks and Caicos Islands.

August 24

- 06:00 UTC (2:00 a.m. AST) near 22.6°N 72.9°W – Tropical Depression Four strengthens into Tropical Storm Cristobal about 15 mi (25 km) north of Mayaguana, the Bahamas.

August 26

- 00:00 UTC (8:00 p.m. EDT, August 25) near 25.1°N 72.1°W – Tropical Storm Cristobal strengthens into a Category 1 hurricane approximately 665 mi (1,075 km) southwest of Bermuda.

Hurricane Cristobal near peak intensity east of the Carolinas on August 28

August 29

- 00:00 UTC (8:00 p.m. AST, August 28) near 39.1°N 58.8°W – Hurricane Cristobal attains its peak intensity with maximum sustained winds of 85 mph (140 km/h) and a minimum barometric pressure of 965 mbar (28.50 inHg), about 570 mi (915 km) northeast of Bermuda.
- 12:00 UTC (8:00 a.m. AST) near 44.2°N 49.0°W – Hurricane Cristobal transitions into an extratropical cyclone about 260 mi (415 km) southeast of Cape Race, Newfoundland.

=== September ===
September 1

- 18:00 UTC (1:00 p.m. CDT) near 20.0°N 93.2°W – Tropical Depression Five develops from a tropical wave about 340 mi (545 km) east-southeast of Tampico, Tamaulipas.

Tropical Storm Dolly approaching the coast of eastern Mexico on September 2

September 2

- 00:00 UTC (7:00 p.m. CDT, September 1) near 21.3°N 93.4°W – Tropical Depression Five intensifies into Tropical Storm Dolly about 295 mi (470 km) east-southeast of Tampico.
- 06:00 UTC (2:00 a.m. AST) near 69.0°N 15.0°W – The extratropical cyclone formerly known as Cristobal merges with another extratropical low off the coast of Iceland.
- 12:00 UTC (7:00 a.m. CDT) near 22.8°N 95.6°W – Tropical Storm Dolly attains its peak sustained winds of 50 mph (85 km/h) about 150 mi (240 km) east-northeast of Tampico.

September 3

- 01:00 UTC (8:00 p.m. CDT, September 2) near 22.0°N 97.4°W – Tropical Storm Dolly attains its lowest barometric pressure of 1,000 mbar (29.53 inHg), about 35 mi (55 km) south-southeast of Tampico.
- 04:00 UTC (11:00 p.m. CDT, September 2) near 22.0°N 97.7°W – Tropical Storm Dolly makes landfall about 35 mi (55 km) south-southeast of Tampico, with sustained winds of 45 mph (75 km/h).
- 12:00 UTC (7:00 a.m CDT) near 21.8°N 98.8°W – Tropical Storm Dolly degenerates inland to a post-tropical low over the Sierra Madre Oriental, about 70 mi (110 km) west-southwest of Tampico, and dissipates within 16 hours.

September 11

- 12:00 UTC (8:00 a.m. AST) near 15.8°N 36.5°W – Tropical Depression Six develops from a tropical wave about 830 mi (1,335 km) west of the Cape Verde Islands.

September 12

- 00:00 UTC (8:00 p.m. AST, September 11) near 17.2°N 39.2°E – Tropical Depression Six intensifies into Tropical Storm Edouard about 920 mi (1,480 km) west of the Cape Verde Islands.

September 14

- 12:00 UTC (8:00 a.m. AST) near 24.4°N 50.3°W – Tropical Storm Edouard intensifies into a Category 1 hurricane about 1,035 mi (1,665 km) southeast of Bermuda.

September 15

- 06:00 UTC (2:00 a.m. AST) near 26.5°N 54.0°W – Hurricane Edouard intensifies into a Category 2 hurricane about 765 mi (1,230 km) southeast of Bermuda.

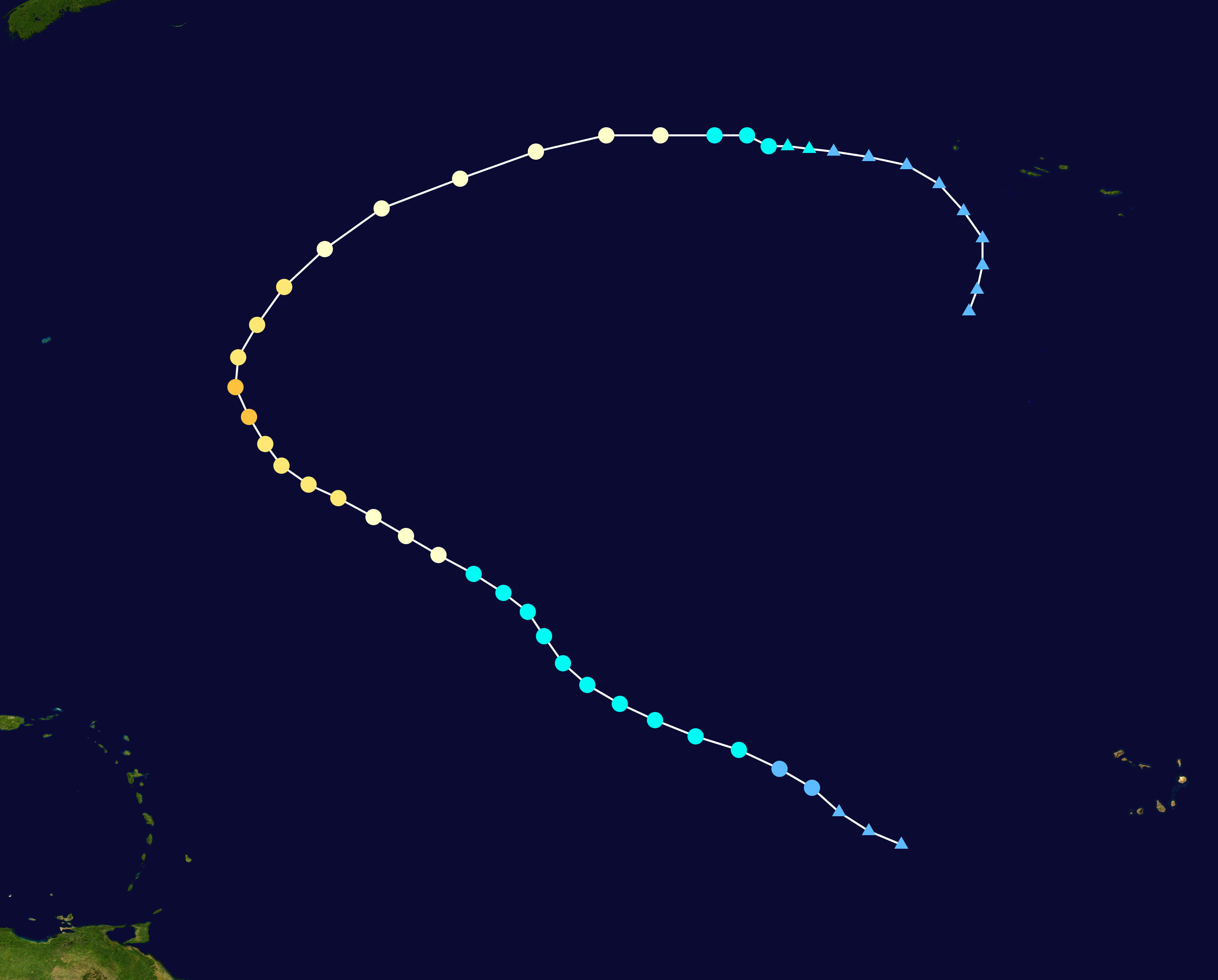
Map plotting the track and the intensity of Edouard (starting at lower right corner)

September 16

- 06:00 UTC (2:00 a.m. AST) near 29.5°N 57.3°W – Hurricane Edouard intensifies into a Category 3 hurricane about 485 mi (780 km) southeast of Bermuda.
- 12:00 UTC (8:00 a.m. AST) near 30.6°N 57.8°W – Hurricane Edouard attains its peak intensity with maximum sustained winds of 120 mph (195 km/h) and a minimum barometric pressure of 955 mbar (28.20 inHg), about 415 mi (665 km) east of Bermuda.
- 18:00 UTC (2:00 p.m. AST) near 31.7°N 57.7°W – Hurricane Edouard weakens to a Category 2 hurricane about 420 mi (675 km) east of Bermuda.

September 17

- 12:00 UTC (8:00 a.m. AST) near 35.7°N 54.5°W – Hurricane Edouard weakens to a Category 1 hurricane about 645 mi (1,035 km) northeast of Bermuda.

September 19

- 00:00 UTC (8:00 p.m. AST, September 18) near 39.9°N 40.1°W – Hurricane Edouard weakens to a tropical storm about 485 mi (780 km) west-southwest of the western Azores.
- 18:00 UTC (2:00 p.m. AST) near 39.5°N 37.4°W – Tropical Storm Edouard degenerates into a post-tropical cyclone about 460 mi (740 km) west of the western Azores.

September 22

- 06:00 UTC (2:00 a.m. AST) near 33.4°N 30.7°W – The low formerly known as Edouard dissipates after merging with a frontal system far to the south-southwest of the Azores.

=== October ===
October 10

- 06:00 UTC (2:00 a.m. AST) near 22.7°N 62.4°W – Subtropical Storm Fay develops from a mid- to upper-level trough about 615 mi (990 km) south of Bermuda.

October 11

- 06:00 UTC (2:00 a.m. AST) near 26.0°N 65.0°W – Subtropical Storm Fay transitions into a tropical storm about 435 mi (705 km) south of Bermuda.

Hurricane Fay over the Atlantic Ocean on October 12

October 12

- 00:00 UTC (8:00 p.m. AST, October 11) near 16.4°N 55.9°W – A tropical depression develops from a tropical wave about 390 mi (630 km) east of the Leeward Islands.
- 06:00 UTC (2:00 a.m. AST) near 31.7°N 64.9°W – Tropical Storm Fay intensifies into a Category 1 hurricane about 40 mi (65 km) south of Bermuda.
- 08:10 UTC (4:10 a.m. AST) near 32.3°N 64.7°W – Hurricane Fay makes landfall on Bermuda with sustained winds of 80 mph (130 km/h).
- 12:00 UTC (8:00 a.m. AST) near 33.1°N 63.9°W – Hurricane Fay attains its peak intensity with maximum sustained winds of 80 mph (130 km/h) and a minimum barometric pressure of 983 mbar (29.03 inHg), about 75 mi (120 km) northeast of Bermuda.
- 12:00 UTC (8:00 a.m. AST) near 16.4°N 57.9°W – The recently formed tropical depression strengthens into Tropical Storm Gonzalo about 255 mi (405 km) east of Antigua.
- 18:00 UTC (2:00 p.m. AST) near 33.6°N 61.9°W – Hurricane Fay weakens to a tropical storm about 190 mi (305 km) northeast of Bermuda.

October 13

- 00:00 (8:00 p.m. AST, October 12) near 33.9°N 59.0°W – Tropical Storm Fay degenerates into an open trough about 350 mi (565 km) east-northeast of Bermuda.
- 12:00 UTC (8:00 a.m. AST) near 17.0°N 61.5°W – Tropical Storm Gonzalo strengthens into a Category 1 hurricane about 25 mi (35 km) east-southeast of Antigua.
- 14:30 UTC (10:30 a.m. AST) near 17.1°N 61.8°W – Hurricane Gonzalo makes landfall on Antigua with sustained winds of 75 mph (120 km/h).
- 22:45 UTC (6:45 p.m. AST) near 18.1°N 63.0°W – Hurricane Gonzalo makes landfall on Saint Martin with sustained winds of 85 mph (140 km/h).
- 23:15 UTC (7:15 p.m. AST) near 18.2°N 63.1°W – Hurricane Gonzalo makes landfall on Anguilla with sustained winds of 85 mph (140 km/h).

October 14

- 06:00 UTC (2:00 a.m. AST) near 19.1°N 64.0°W – Hurricane Gonzalo intensifies into a Category 2 hurricane about 40 mi (65 km) northeast of Anegada, British Virgin Islands.
- 18:00 UTC (2:00 p.m. AST) near 20.8°N 65.5°W – Hurricane Gonzalo intensifies into a Category 3 hurricane about 165 mi (270 km) north of San Juan, Puerto Rico.

October 15

- 00:00 UTC (8:00 p.m. AST, October 14) near 21.7°N 66.2°W – Hurricane Gonzalo intensifies into a Category 4 hurricane about 225 mi (360 km) north of San Juan, Puerto Rico, and simultaneously attains an initial peak maximum sustained windspeed of 130 mph (215 km/h).
- 18:00 UTC (2:00 p.m. AST) near 23.8°N 68.3°W – Hurricane Gonzalo weakens to a Category 3 hurricane about 625 mi (1,005 km) south-southwest of Bermuda.

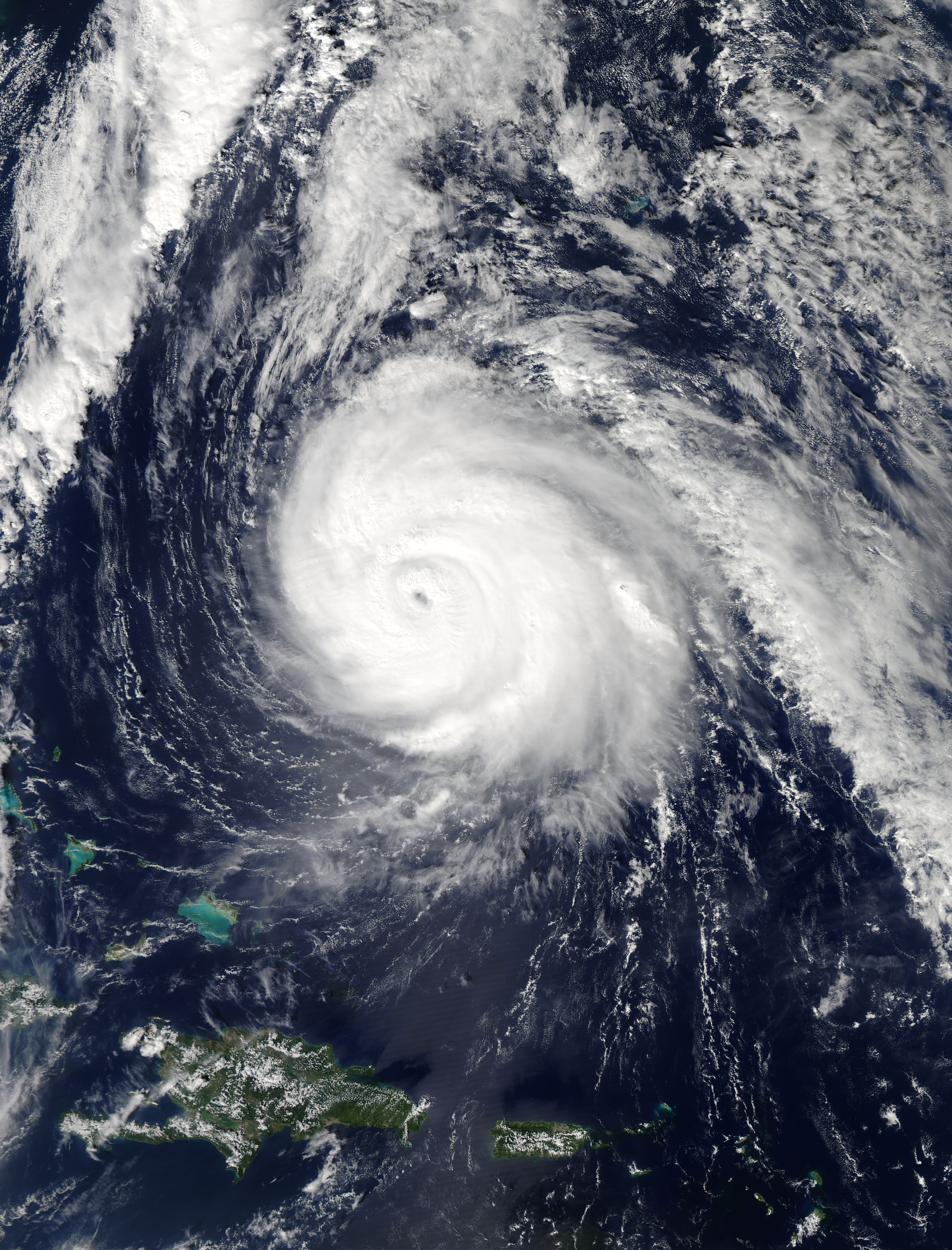
Hurricane Gonzalo at peak intensity over the Atlantic Ocean on October 16

October 16

- 06:00 UTC (2:00 a.m. AST) near 25.0°N 68.7°W – Hurricane Gonzalo re-intensifies into a Category 4 hurricane about 555 mi (895 km) south-southwest of Bermuda.
- 12:00 UTC (8:00 a.m. AST) near 25.6°N 68.7°W – Hurricane Gonzalo attains its peak intensity with maximum sustained winds of 145 mph (230 km/h) and a minimum barometric pressure of 940 mbar (27.76 inHg), about 525 mi (845 km) south-southwest of Bermuda.

October 17

- 12:00 UTC (8:00 a.m. AST) near 29.8°N 66.5°W – Hurricane Gonzalo again weakens to a Category 3 hurricane about 200 mi (325 km) south-southwest of Bermuda.

October 18

- 00:00 UTC (8:00 p.m. AST, October 17) near 32.2°N 64.9°W – Hurricane Gonzalo weakens to a Category 2 hurricane about 10 mi (15 km) south-southwest of Bermuda.
- 00:30 UTC (8:30 p.m. AST, October 17) near 32.3°N 64.8°W – Hurricane Gonzalo makes landfall on Bermuda with sustained winds of 110 mph (175 km/h).

October 19

- 06:00 UTC (2:00 a.m. AST) near 44.5°N 54.8°W – Hurricane Gonzalo weakens to a Category 1 hurricane about 170 mi (275 km) southwest of the southeastern tip of the Avalon Peninsula of Newfoundland.
- 18:00 UTC (2:00 p.m. AST) near 50.6°N 44.8°W – Hurricane Gonzalo transitions into an extratropical cyclone about 460 mi (740 km) northeast of Cape Race, Newfoundland.

October 20

- 06:00 UTC (2:00 a.m. AST) near 53.9°N 30.9°W – The extratropical cyclone formerly known as Gonzolo is absorbed by a cold front south-southwest of Iceland.

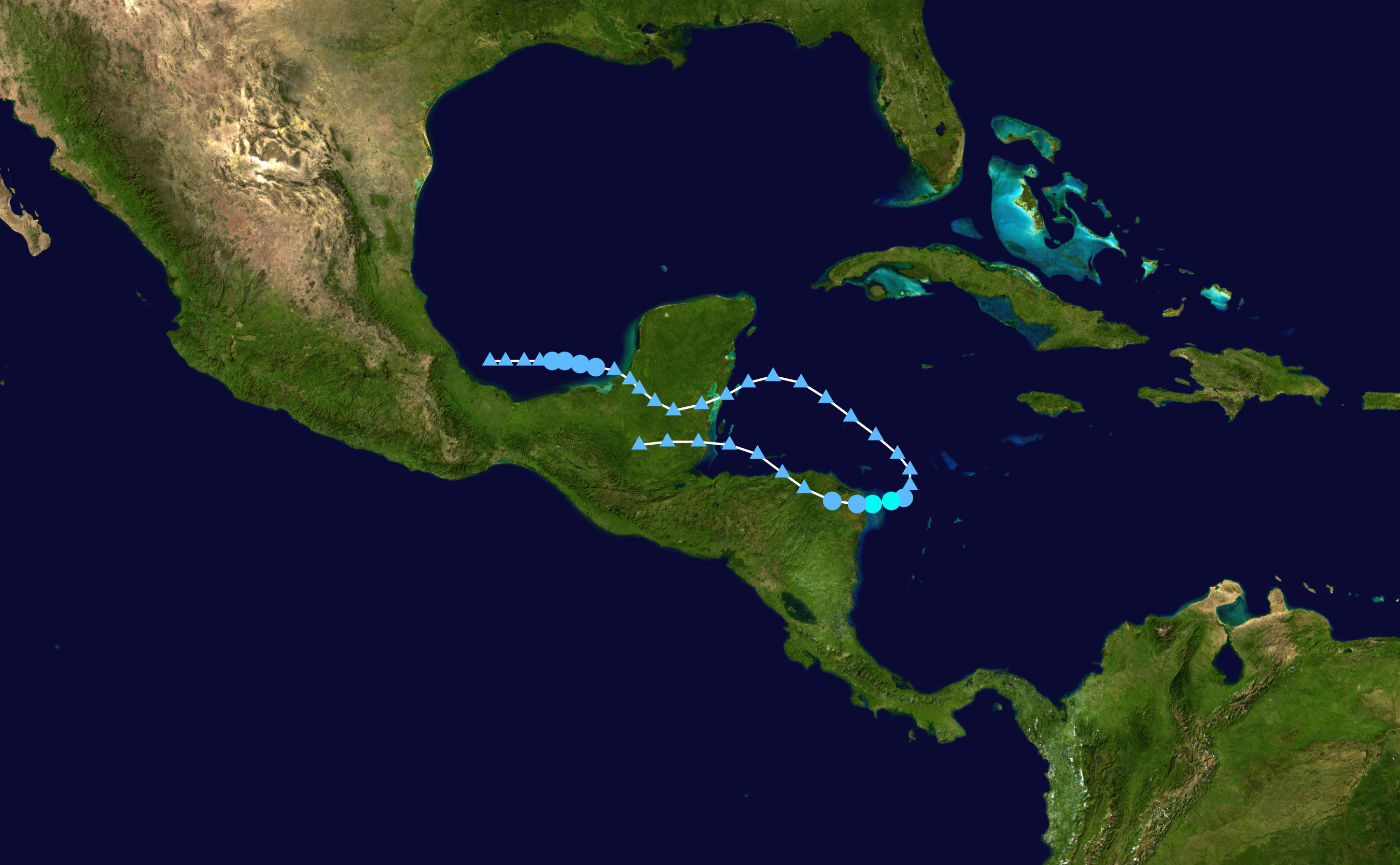
Map plotting the track and the intensity of Hanna (starting at center left)

October 22

- 00:00 UTC (7:00 p.m. CDT, October 21) near 19.5°N 93.3°W – A tropical depression develops from the remnants of eastern Pacific Tropical Storm Trudy about 175 mi (280 km) west of Campeche City, Campeche, and simultaneously attains its lowest barometric pressure of 1,000 mbar (29.53 inHg).

October 23

- 00:00 UTC (7:00 p.m. CDT, October 22) near 19.2°N 91.3°W – The tropical depression degenerates into a remnant low about 65 mi (100 km) southwest of Campeche City.

October 25

- 00:00 UTC (8:00 p.m. EDT, October 24) near 19.0°N 86.2°W – The remnant low opens into a trough over the Caribbean Sea, east of the Yucatán Peninsula.

October 26

- 12:00 UTC (8:00 a.m. EDT) near 16.0°N 81.8°W – The remnant trough regenerates into a closed area of low pressure about 115 mi (185 km) east-northeast of Cabo Gracias a Dios on the Honduras–Nicaragua border.

October 27

- 00:00 UTC (8:00 p.m. EDT, October 26) near 15.1°N 82.0°W – The low regenerates into a tropical depression about 80 mi (130 km) east-northeast of the Honduras–Nicaragua border.
- 06:00 UTC (2:00 a.m. EDT) near 15.0°N 82.4°W – The tropical depression intensifies into Tropical Storm Hanna about 50 mi (85 km) east of Cabo Gracias a Dios, and simultaneously attains its peak sustained winds of 40 mph (65 km/h).
- 16:00 UTC (12:00 p.m. EDT) near 14.9°N 83.3°W – Tropical Storm Hanna makes landfall about 10 mi (20 km) west-southwest of Cabo Gracias a Dios with sustained winds of 40 mph (65 km/h).
- 18:00 UTC (2:00 p.m. EDT) near 14.9°N 83.5°W – Tropical Storm Hanna weakens to a tropical depression inland about 25 mi (35 km) west-southwest of Cabo Gracias a Dios.

October 28

- 06:00 UTC (2:00 a.m. EDT) near 15.4°N 85.2°W – Tropical Depression Hanna degenerates into a remnant low about 140 mi (220 km) west-northwest of Cabo Gracias a Dios, and dissipates within 12 hours.

=== November ===
- No tropical cyclones form in the Atlantic Ocean during the month of November.

November 30

- The 2014 Atlantic hurricane season officially ends.

== See also ==
- Timeline of the 2014 Pacific hurricane season
