= Hurricane Arthur =

Category 2 Atlantic hurricane in 2014

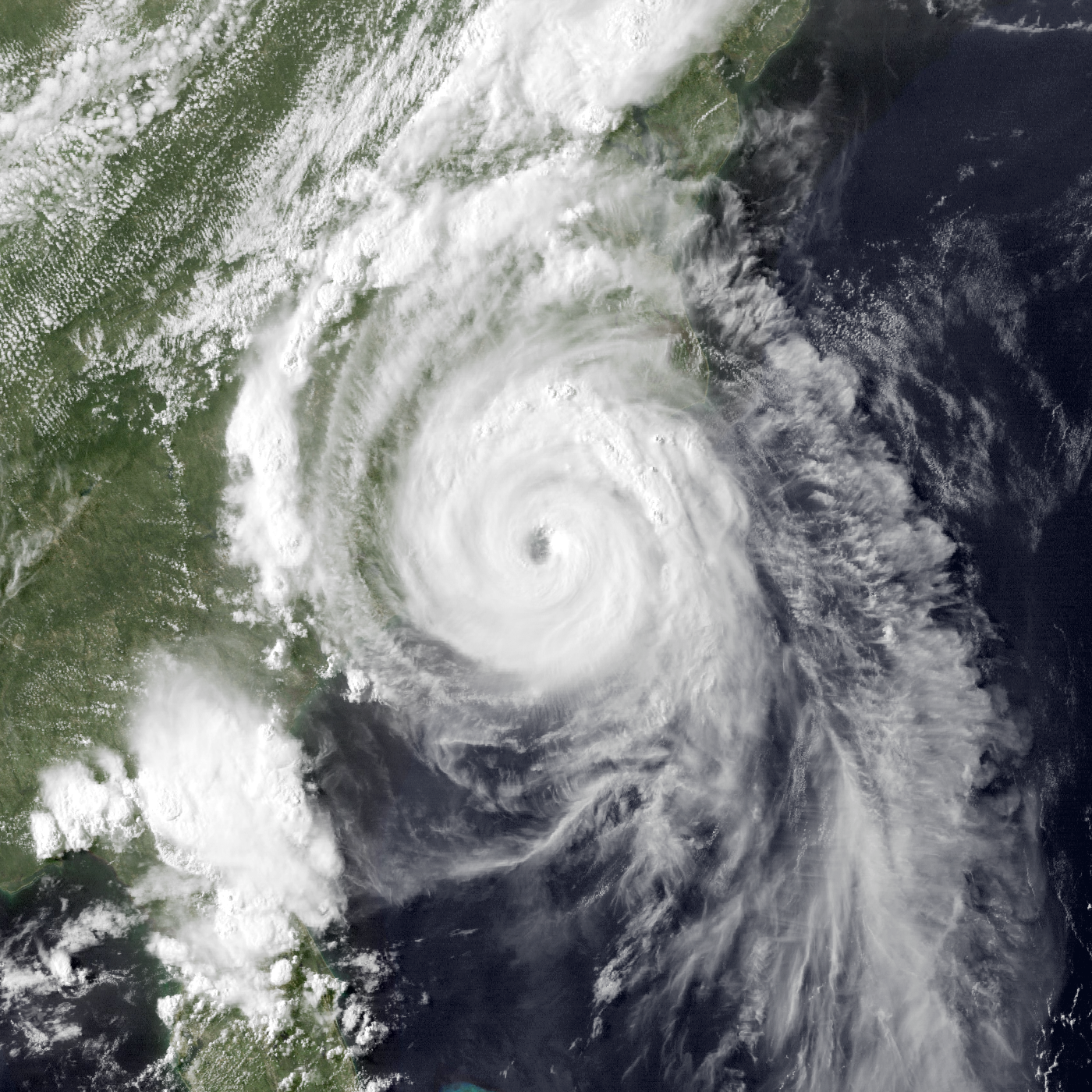
- Arthur near peak intensity south of North Carolina on July 3

Meteorological history
- Formed: July 1, 2014
- Extratropical: July 5, 2014
- Dissipated: July 9, 2014

Category 2 hurricane
- 1-minute sustained (SSHWS/NWS)
- Highest winds: 100 mph (155 km/h)
- Lowest pressure: 973 mbar (hPa); 28.73 inHg

Overall effects
- Fatalities: 2 indirect
- Damage: $39.5 million (2014 USD)
- Areas affected: The Bahamas; Eastern United States; Eastern Canada; Quebec
- IBTrACS
- Part of the 2014 Atlantic hurricane season

Hurricane Arthur was the earliest known hurricane to make landfall in the U.S. state of North Carolina in 2014. It was also the first hurricane to make landfall in the United States since Hurricane Isaac in 2012. The first named storm of the 2014 Atlantic hurricane season, Arthur developed from an initially non-tropical area of low-pressure over the Southeastern United States that emerged into the western Atlantic Ocean on June 28. After sufficiently organizing, developing a well-defined circulation and deep convection amid a favorable environment, it was classified as a tropical depression on July 1. The system continued to strengthen and was declared a tropical storm later that day. Drifting northward, the storm reached hurricane status early on July 3 and curved toward the north-northeast. Further structural organization resulted in additional intensification, and by 01:00 UTC on July 4, the system attained its peak winds of 100 mph (160 km/h) as a Category 2 hurricane on the Saffir–Simpson hurricane wind scale. Arthur made landfall at 03:15 UTC over North Carolina's Shackleford Banks, positioned between Cape Lookout and Beaufort, and intensified slightly further, with a minimum atmospheric pressure of 973 mbar (hPa; 28.70 inHg). The storm then trekked swiftly northeast, weakening as it passed by Cape Cod and Nantucket, before transitioning into an extratropical cyclone and coming ashore at Weymouth, Nova Scotia, on July 5. The remnants continued generally northeastward through Atlantic Canada before ultimately dissipating on July 9 over the Labrador Sea.

Numerous tropical cyclone warnings and watches were issued for areas along the East Coast of the United States. A state of emergency was declared for 26 North Carolina counties, and both mandatory and voluntary evacuations were imposed along the state's coast. Several hundred government personnel were deployed to assist in evacuation and preparation efforts, along with heavy equipment capable of removing sand and debris. Due to the hurricane's timing, many Independence Day activities in the U.S. were cancelled or rescheduled. Damage was limited to strewn debris and inundated roads, and though 44,000 power outages were reported and widespread flooding occurred along northern sections of the coast, no deaths or serious injuries were reported. In New England, Arthur brought flash flooding and caused additional power outages, resulting in widespread road closures and suspension of ferry service. Losses in the country amounted to US$10 million.

In Atlantic Canada and Quebec, hurricane-force gusts associated Arthur's remnants produced widespread damage. Countless trees and power lines fell across the region, leaving more than 300,000 without electricity. Damage to the power grid in Nova Scotia was regarded as the worst since Hurricane Juan in 2003. Efforts to restore and repair infrastructure were prolonged, with thousands still without power 10 days after the storm. Efforts to restore and repair damage to the electrical grid cost C$8.4 million (US$7.9 million). Reviews of Nova Scotia Power (NSP) and New Brunswick Power (NBP) were called upon due to numerous complaints from customers and politicians alike. A communication breakdown between NSP and the public exacerbated problems, and Nova Scotia Premier Stephen McNeil condemned the company's response as "inexcusable." Similarly severe impacts were felt by NBP which suffered a record-breaking C$23 million (US$21.6 million) in damage from the storm.

== Meteorological history ==
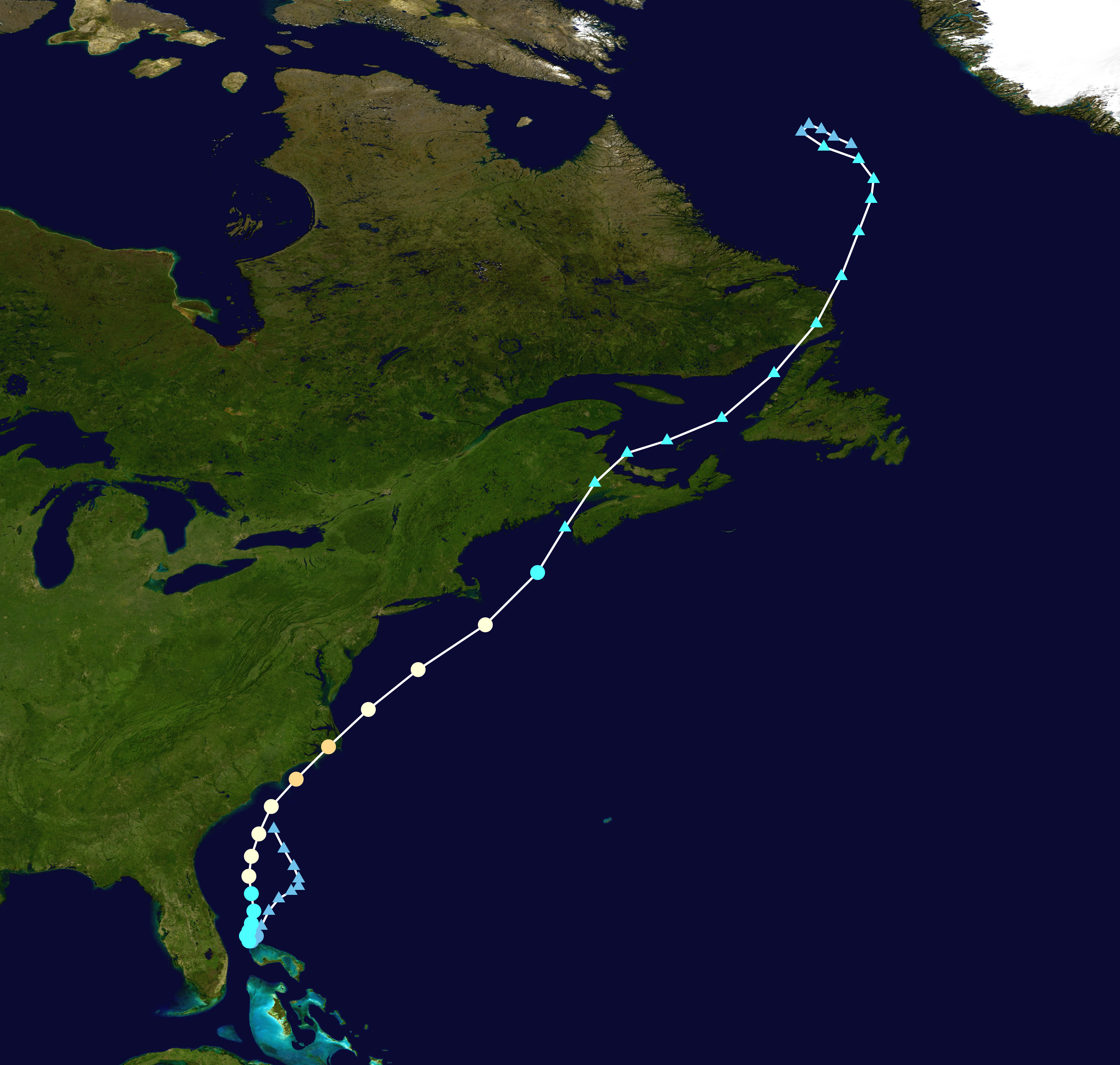
Map plotting the storm's track and intensity, according to the Saffir–Simpson scale Map key Saffir–Simpson scale Tropical depression (≤38 mph, ≤62 km/h) Tropical storm (39–73 mph, 63–118 km/h) Category 1 (74–95 mph, 119–153 km/h) Category 2 (96–110 mph, 154–177 km/h) Category 3 (111–129 mph, 178–208 km/h) Category 4 (130–156 mph, 209–251 km/h) Category 5 (≥157 mph, ≥252 km/h) Unknown Storm type Tropical cyclone Subtropical cyclone Extratropical cyclone, remnant low, tropical disturbance, or monsoon depression

On June 25, 2014, an area of showers and thunderstorms developed over the northern Gulf of Mexico ahead of a shortwave trough in Texas. That day, National Hurricane Center (NHC) began monitoring the possibility of tropical cyclogenesis off the Southeast United States over the following week as the system was expected to encounter favorable environmental conditions. An area of low-level vorticity consolidated within the system on June 26 as it moved northeast across Louisiana, Mississippi, and Alabama. The following day it became intertwined with a frontal boundary over Georgia and South Carolina before emerging over the far western Atlantic Ocean early on June 28. An area of low-pressure soon formed within the system just off the coast of South Carolina. Generally favorable environmental conditions fostered further organization of the low, though convection remained minimal for several days. During the latter half of June 30, a United States Air Force weather reconnaissance mission into the system confirmed the presence of a well-organized circulation; however, displacement of showers and thunderstorms from its center delayed its classification. Subsequent organization of convection into a banding feature along the system's southern flank, as depicted by radar imagery, prompted the NHC to designate the low as Tropical Depression One at 00:00 UTC on July 1. Situated 70 mi (110 km) east-southeast of Fort Pierce, Florida, the newly christened depression moved slowly westward within an area of weak steering currents. A turn northward was forecast as a mid-level ridge built over the Atlantic.

Infrared satellite loop of Arthur organizing north of the Bahamas on July 1

Throughout July 1, steady structural organization ensued. Around 15:00 UTC winds of 38 mph (61 km/h) were measured at Settlement Point on Grand Bahama, prompting the NHC to upgrade the depression to a tropical storm and assign it the name Arthur. Though environmental conditions surrounding the cyclone favored development, moderate wind shear and intrusions of dry air into the circulation prolonged organization. The effects of the shear showed clearly on WSR-88D radar imagery from Melbourne, Florida which depicted a mid-level eye feature displaced 30 to 35 mi (48 to 56 km) from the low-level center. By July 2, Arthur acquired a steady northward track as previously forecast. Throughout the day, convection consolidated around a developing eye as wind shear abated and the storm neared hurricane strength, with winds reaching 70 mph (115 km/h).

Early on July 3, data from hurricane hunters flying in the storm indicated that Arthur attained hurricane-status about 190 mi (310 km) south-southwest of Cape Fear, North Carolina. At this time, the hurricane began turning slightly to the north-northeast as it approached a weakness in the subtropical ridge ahead of a deep-layer trough over the Eastern United States. Continued improvement of the storm's convective structure fostered intensification as the storm neared the North Carolina coastline. At 00:00 UTC on July 4, Arthur reached its peak winds of 100 mph, ranking it as a Category 2 hurricane on the Saffir–Simpson hurricane wind scale. It was the first hurricane to reach such strength since Hurricane Sandy in the 2012 Atlantic hurricane season. The storm featured a well-defined 25 to 30 mi (40 to 48 km) wide eye at this time. Thereafter, the hurricane made landfall at 03:15 UTC over the Shackleford Banks of North Carolina, located between Cape Lookout and Beaufort. Upon doing so, it became the earliest instance of a hurricane making landfall in the state during a calendar year, surpassing the previous record of July 11 set by an unnamed hurricane in 1901. Slight deepening of the cyclone occurred as it moved over Pamlico Sound, with its barometric pressure bottoming out at 973 mbar (hPa; 28.73 inHg). Continuing across Pamlico Sound, Arthur's eye brushed the coastline of Dare County before striking just north of Oregon Inlet at 07:00 and 08:00 UTC, respectively.

NASA animation showing progress of Hurricane Arthur, rain rates and internal structure from GPM satellite data

After re-emerging over the Atlantic Ocean on July 4 Arthur began to weaken. Though its eye remained well-defined, winds aloft in the storm failed to effectively mix down to the surface. Traversing decreasing sea surface temperatures and amid increasing shear, Arthur began transitioning into an extratropical cyclone later that day. Cloud tops associated with the system warmed and its structure became asymmetric. Reconnaissance continued to indicate strong flight-level winds of 119 mph (192 km/h) but surface winds at the time did not exceed 80 km/h (50 mph). Accelerating ahead of the trough over the East Coast, Arthur's eye dissipated early on July 5; the storm passed within 75 mi (121 km) of Chatham, Massachusetts around 03:00 UTC. Convection became increasingly displaced to the northeast as dry air entrained into the western portions of the circulation. Surface winds decreased below hurricane-force by 06:00 UTC, and Arthur completed its conversion to an extratropical system at 12:00 UTC as it moved over the Bay of Fundy. The NHC subsequently issued its final advisory on the storm and shifted warning responsibility to the Canadian Hurricane Centre.

The remnants of Arthur re-intensified somewhat as it traversed The Maritimes; a sting jet with gusts of 65–80 mph (105–129 km/h) developed along the storm's backside. The former hurricane made an additional landfall in the region near Fundy National Park by 18:00 UTC. By July 6, the sting jet had dissipated, and steady weakening of the cyclone resumed as only a split jet provided upper-level support to the storm. Turning back to the northeast, Arthur moved through Labrador later that day. Once over the Labrador Sea, Arthur turned northwest while weakening before doubling back to the southeast. After weakening below gale-force strength, the extratropical system dissipated late on July 9.

Meteorologists noted to improved accuracy in the National Oceanic and Atmospheric Administration's Geophysical Fluid Dynamics Laboratory and Hurricane Weather Research and Forecasting models in predicting the intensity and track of Hurricane Arthur.

== Preparations ==
Weather alerts at 02:24 UTC on July 4 as Hurricane Arthur made landfall in North Carolina
Hurricane Warning	Tropical Storm Warning
Tornado Warning	Tornado Watch
Flood Advisory	Special Weather Statement

Multiple tropical cyclone warnings and watches were posted along the East Coast of the United States in advance of Arthur's impacts in Florida, the Carolinas, New England, and Atlantic Canada. Upon developing into a tropical cyclone early on July 1, a tropical storm watch was issued in Florida from Fort Pierce to Flagler Beach. At 09:00 UTC the next day, the tropical storm watch was discontinued south of Sebastian Inlet, while another one was posted from the Santee River in South Carolina to Bogue Banks in North Carolina. Additionally, a hurricane watch was issued for Oregon Inlet to the North Carolina–Virginia state line. Later on July 2, a tropical storm warning became in effect from the North Carolina side of the Little River Inlet to the state line with Virginia. Simultaneously, the tropical storm watch in Florida was removed.

At 21:00 UTC on July 2, a hurricane warning was posted in North Carolina from Surf City to Duck, including Albemarle and Pamlico sounds. Additionally, a tropical storm warning was issued from the Santee River to Surf City, while another one became in effect from Duck to Cape Charles Light in Virginia, including the mouth of Chesapeake Bay. A tropical storm warning was posted in Massachusetts at 21:00 UTC on July 3, stretching from Provincetown to Chatham along Cape Cod including Nantucket, in addition to a tropical storm watch between Port Maitland and Point Aconi issued by Environment Canada. Around 01:00 UTC on July 4, the hurricane watch was discontinued south of Surf City, while the tropical storm warning was discontinued south of Little River Inlet. Two hours later, the tropical storm warning was canceled south of Cape Fear, North Carolina, and tropical storm watches in Canada were expanded to encompass New Brunswick from the Canada–United States border to Grande Anse, including Cape Breton Island, and Prince Edward Island.

Radar loop of Arthur on July 1 as it meandered east of Florida

The tropical storm warning from Surf City to Cape Fear was discontinued at 05:00 UTC on July 4. A few hours later, the portion of the hurricane warning south of Bogue Inlet was removed. At 09:00 UTC on July 4, the tropical storm warning in Massachusetts was extended westward to Woods Hole. Around that time, areas west of Cape Lookout in North Carolina were no longer under a hurricane warning. In North Carolina, the hurricane warning was canceled for areas south of Ocracoke Inlet at 11:00 UTC. All hurricane warnings in the state were discontinued four hours later, as was the tropical storm warning at Albemarle Sound; in addition, all tropical storm watches issued by Environment Canada were then converted to tropical storm warnings. By 18:00 UTC on July 4, the tropical storm warning on the east coast of Virginia, including the mouth of Chesapeake Bay, was discontinued. After passing by Nantucket and Cape Cod, the remaining tropical storm warnings in New England were rescinded.

Governor of North Carolina Pat McCrory declared a state of emergency for 25 counties in advance of the hurricane's arrival. Fourteen shelters were opened, and the deteriorating North Carolina Highway 12 Bonner Bridge was closed as a precaution. Mandatory evacuations were declared for Hatteras Island and Richland Township in Beaufort County while voluntary evacuations were announced for Ocracoke Island, Aurora, Pamlico Beach, and Belhaven. Approximately 4,300 individuals fled from Ocracoke Island via ferry despite only being under a voluntary evacuation, and while a mandatory evacuation had been encouraged by Hyde County's emergency management director, other officials turned down the request. Tornado watches were issued for 10 North Carolina counties. In preparation for the possibility that Arthur's storm surge would make North Carolina Highway 12 and Hatteras Island inaccessible, local officials deployed heavy equipment capable of removing sand and other debris.

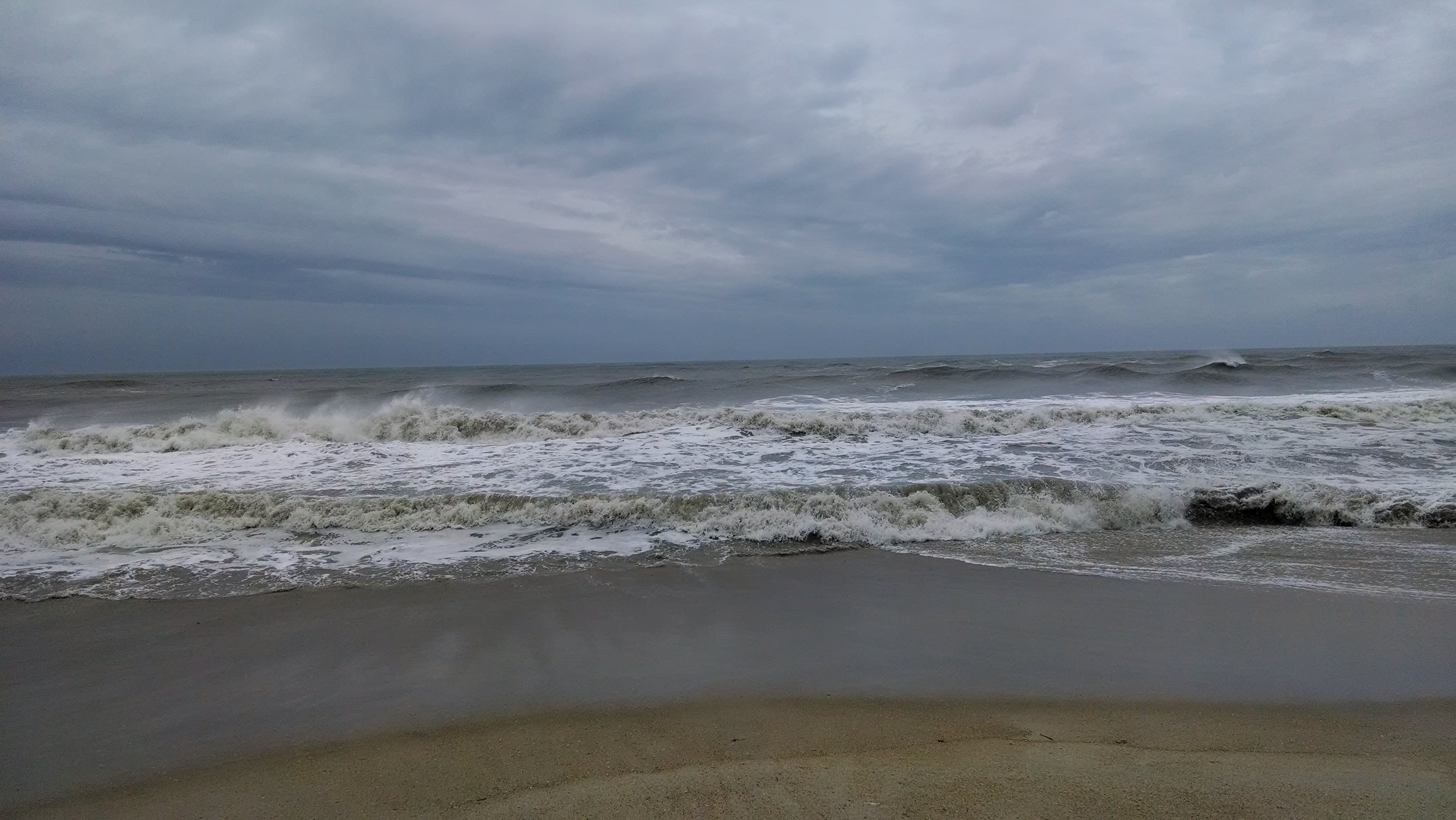
High waves on Assateague Island caused by Arthur

To assist in storm preparations, 105 North Carolina National Guard members and 400 state highway patrol officers helped facilitate evacuations and storm preparations along the state's coastline. Pamlico Sound ferry service was suspended, and various Independence Day activities rescheduled. Meanwhile, in Ocean City, Maryland, a celebratory fireworks event was postponed to July 5, and in Boston, a Fourth of July Boston Pops concert and fireworks display were rescheduled to July 3. Fireworks displays were also postponed throughout Rhode Island. National Weather Service and Coast Guard officials warned of the potential for rip currents along the East Coast resulting from Arthur. The National Park Service-operated Wright Brothers National Memorial and Cape Lookout National Seashore were closed in anticipation of the storm. Several airlines waived change fees for travelers in areas affected by Arthur. Officials at Seymour Johnson Air Force Base sent more than 54 aircraft to Dayton, Ohio to prevent the occurrence of potential wind damage. In Nantucket, Massachusetts, a school was converted to a temporary shelter in anticipation of Arthur's arrival.

In anticipation of Arthur's arrival, Nova Scotia Power prepared and collected resources in case of power outages and other impacts in the region. Numerous weekend events were called off throughout the Canadian Maritimes, including the Stan Rogers Folk Festival. Multiple boat-owners and fisherman took extra precautions by battening down hatches and tying extra lines to wharves to keep ships and boats from coming loose in the storm. Environment Canada officials issued high wind warnings in addition to earlier tropical storm warnings for the Maritimes and considered imposing rainfall warnings for western portions of Prince Edward Island as well. Province-managed parks in Nova Scotia, including beaches and camping grounds, were shut down prior to Arthur's arrival, and several airlines waived transfer fees. Officials in Moncton stated that city personnel would be prepared to respond to potential issues caused by Arthur, such as flooding or fallen trees, while the Canadian Red Cross readied volunteers in case of the need for emergency assistance. The Point Lepreau Nuclear Generating Station took precautionary measures against the storm, with Canadian Nuclear Safety Commission employees deployed to the site.

== Impact ==
=== Bahamas ===
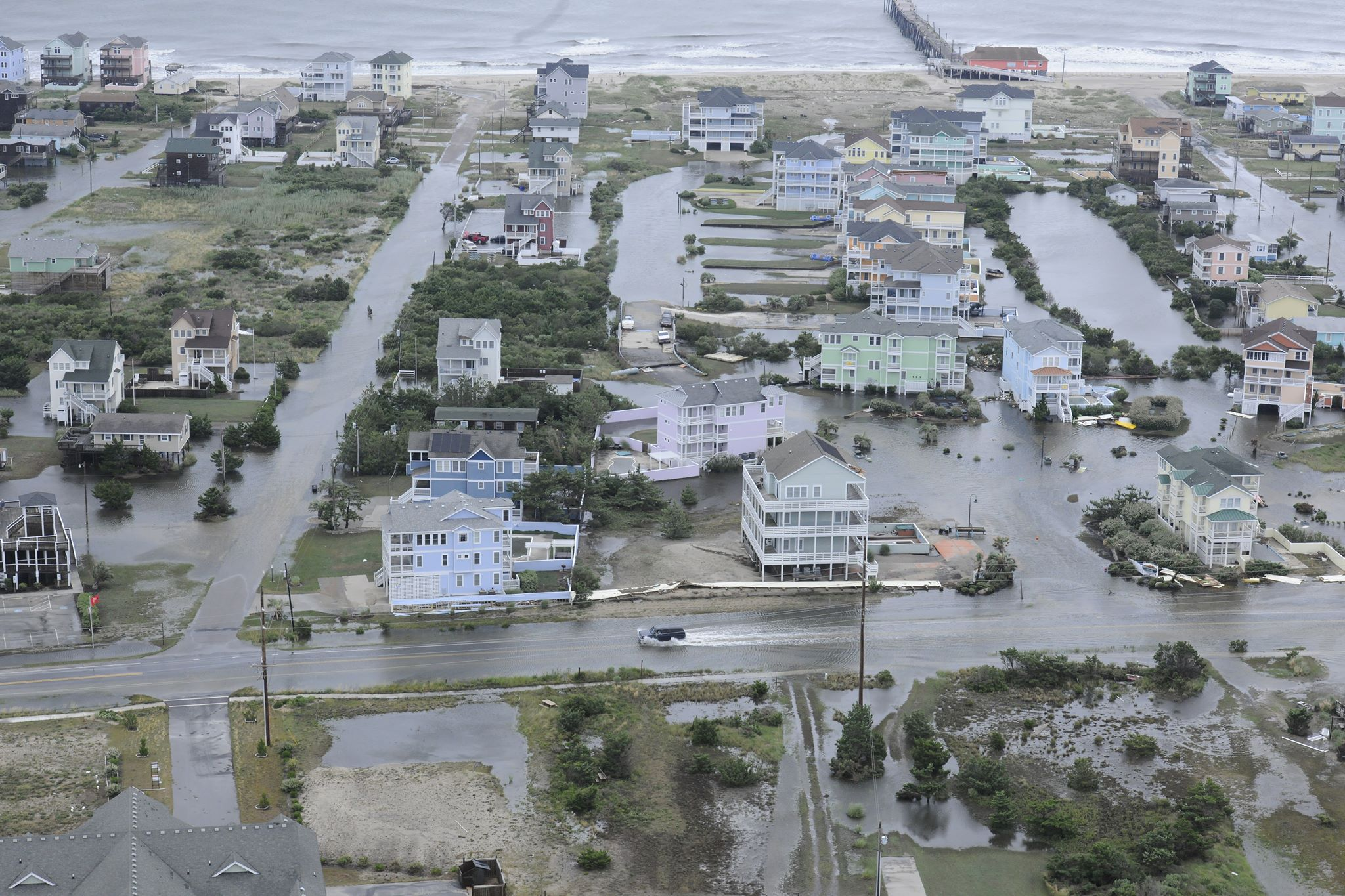
Flooding at Rodanthe Pier on Hatteras Island following the passage of Hurricane Arthur.

Between June 30 and July 1, the outer bands of Arthur produced light rain over the northwestern Bahamas, with 1.26 in (32 mm) measured in Freeport. Winds at Settlement Point on Grand Bahama peaked at 47 mph (76 km/h) with gusts to 61 mph (98 km/h).

=== United States ===
Total damage in the United States was estimated at more than $10 million.

==== Florida, Georgia, and South Carolina ====
Although Arthur remained offshore, large scale northerly flow from the west side of the cyclone sparked scattered severe thunderstorms across Florida for several days. Effects from these storms were generally minor with damage amounting to only $23,000. On July 3 however, one storm produced straight-line winds estimated at 70–80 mph (110–130 km/h) and caused two barns to collapse near Elkton. Similar effects were felt in coastal Georgia with scattered thunderstorms causing minor damage. Farther north in South Carolina, Arthur produced wind gusts up to 42 mph (68 km/h) along coastal areas, resulting in scattered power outages. Heavy rains also fell in and around Myrtle Beach, with a peak of 8.73 in (222 mm) measured just outside the city; this was the highest total observed in relation to the storm throughout the country.

==== North Carolina ====
AVN color loop of Arthur making landfall in Outer Banks on July 4

Hurricane Arthur was the earliest recorded landfalling North Carolina hurricane, coming onshore at 03:15 UTC on July 4. At Cape Lookout, a peak wind gust of 101 mph (163 km/h) and 1-minute maximum sustained winds of 77 mph (124 km/h) were recorded. A United States Coast Guard station in Cape Hatteras observed a peak gust of 91 mph (146 km/h). An EF1 tornado touched down in Duplin County, damaging two structures and many trees, while a funnel cloud was sighted within the vicinity of Elm City. Another EF1 tornado was reported in Martin County, which knocked a tree onto a house. The highest rainfall total measured as a result of Arthur in North Carolina, 4.20 inches (107 mm), was recorded at Kinston. High tides were reported along the coast, with a peak storm surge of 4.5 ft (1.4 m) at Oregon Inlet.

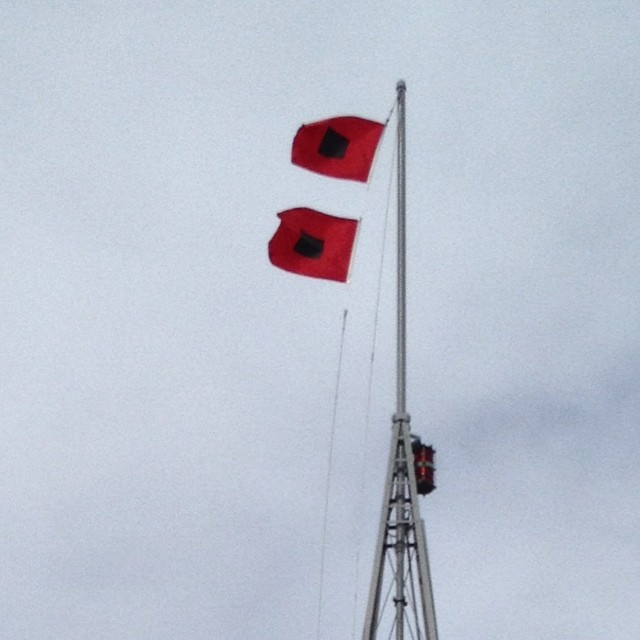
Hurricane Warning Flags hoisted up during the approach of Arthur on July 3

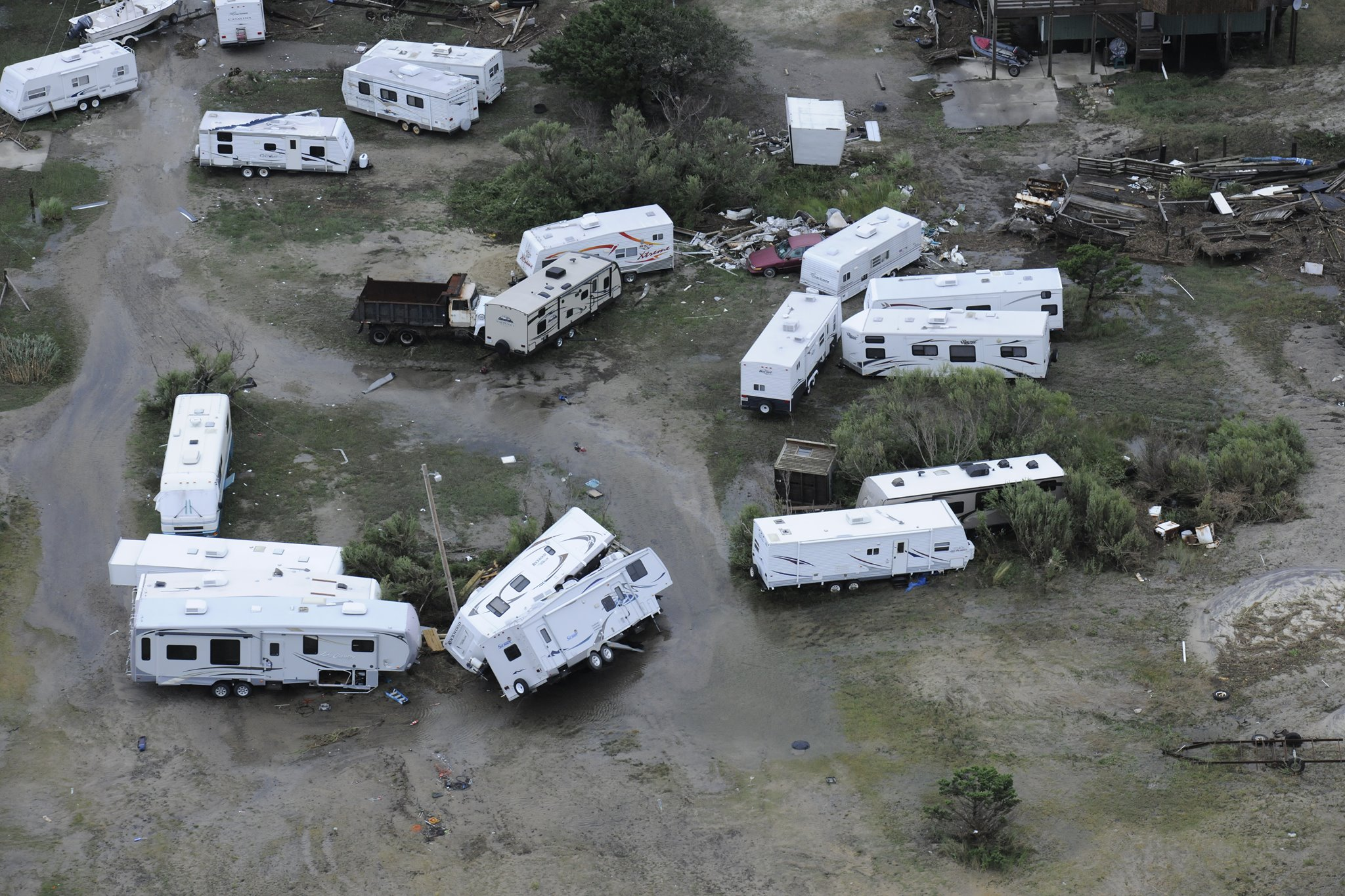
Overturned mobile homes in North Carolina damaged by Arthur's high winds

Arthur caused power outages impacting at least 44,000 customers, of which 16,500 were in Carteret County; another 1,000 outages each occurred in Craven and New Hanover counties. As a result, Duke Energy deployed over 500 personnel to restore electrical service, while Tideland EMC handled more than 2,000 outages in Pamlico, Hyde and Craven counties. Strong winds toppled trees and power poles in Hyde County and Ocracoke Island, and flooding occurred just south of downtown Wilmington, North Carolina. On other areas along the coast, flood waters reached 3 to 6 feet (0.91 to 1.83 m) deep; with widespread coastal erosion observed in many areas. Meanwhile, at Wrightsville Beach, the hurricane tore off shingles and partially defoliated palm trees, and in Manteo, 6 to 8 inches (150 to 200 mm) of water inundated several businesses. Nearby, Kill Devil Hills experienced flooding to numerous residences and roads. Copious rainfall and strong winds were reported along the Outer Banks; at least one additional county was added to the North Carolina's state of emergency declaration, and while officials in Dare County initially intended to cut off access to the county while potential destruction was being surveyed, the curfew ended just after sunrise. Emergency officials announced the intention to begin damage assessments throughout the state as sunrise approached and Arthur departed the region.

After experiencing a "communication failure" with Ocracoke Island officials, a generator and communication equipment were delivered via ferry there. North Carolina Highway 12, the only road linking Hatteras Island to the mainland, remained closed after Arthur's passage, covered under water and sand. The repair cost for the road was less than $1 million. In Manteo, parts of U.S. Route 64 were shut down due to flooding, and northern portions of the North Carolina coastline also experienced significant flooding. Few flight cancellations were made necessary by Arthur's approach along the East Coast, as the storm's impacts were primarily offshore, and damage was limited to strewn debris and inundated roads. Overall, damage along the North Carolina shoreline was slight, and no fatalities or severe injuries were recorded. Throughout the county a total of 161 structures sustained damage, 16 of which had major damage, while none were destroyed. Damage in North Carolina amounted to $2.35 million, almost entirely in Dare County alone. The low damage across the state was largely due to the storm's fast motion.

==== Mid-Atlantic and New England ====
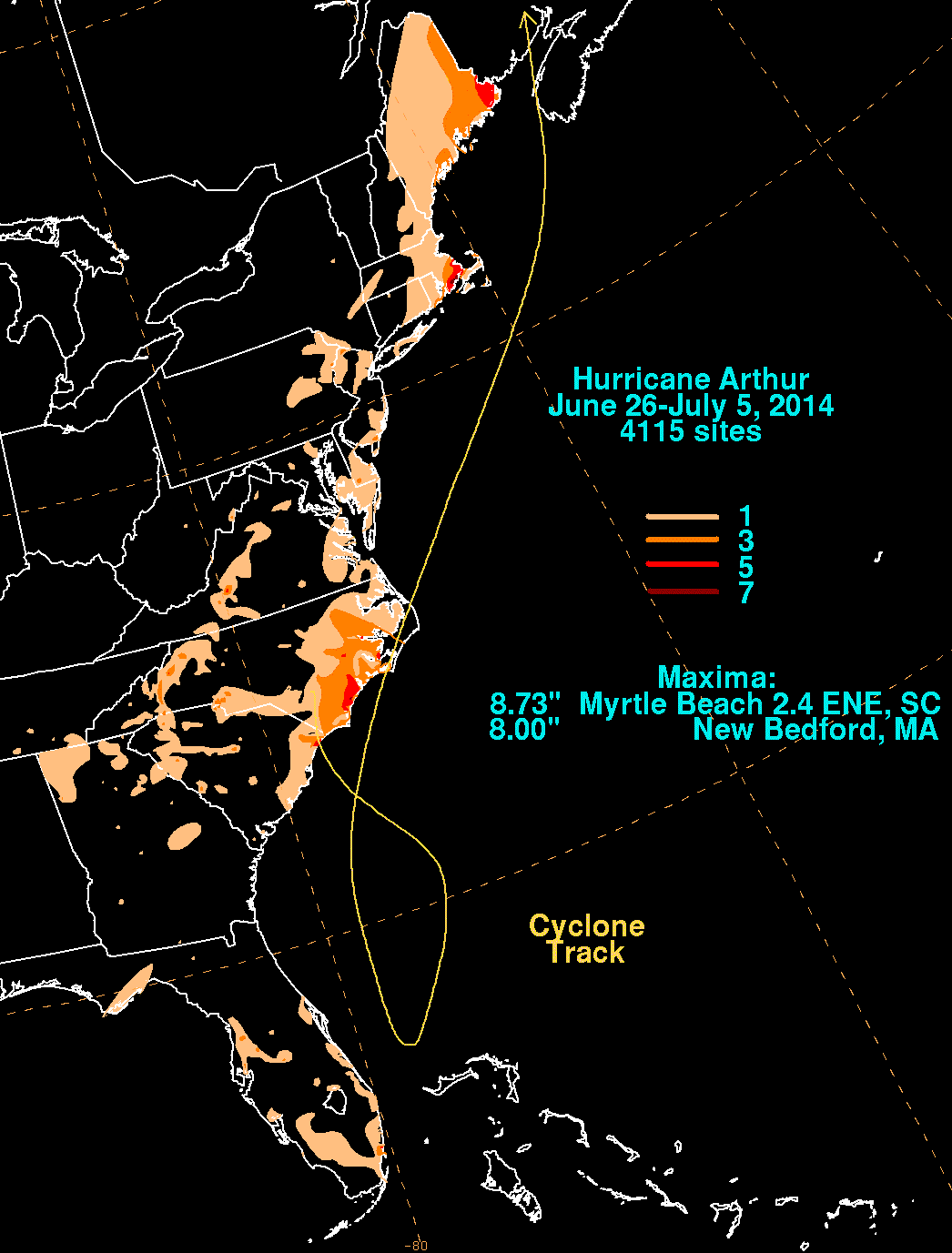
Rainfall accumulations from Hurricane Arthur across the Eastern United States

Owing to Arthur's somewhat large size, strong winds and light rains impacted portions of the Delmarva Peninsula. In Virginia, sustained winds peaked at 55 mph (89 km/h) at Rappahannock Light with gusts up to 60 mph (97 km/h). Tropical storm force winds were mostly confined to coastal areas of Delaware and Maryland. Maximum storm surge was 2.38 ft (0.73 m) in Money Point, Virginia and 2.34 ft (0.71 m) in Lewes, Delaware. Notable storm tides also occurred in Connecticut, New Jersey, and New York, peaking at 3.49 ft (1.06 m) in Bridgeport, Connecticut.

Sustained winds of 49 mph (79 km/h) and gusts to 63 mph (101 km/h) were reported near Nantucket Island in Massachusetts as Arthur passed just offshore. Flooding was reported within the vicinity of Broad and Easy streets on Nantucket Island, and heavy rains induced widespread flooding elsewhere as well, with up to 8.00 inches (203 mm) of rain measured at New Bedford, 7.20 inches (183 mm) at Plymouth, and 6.26 inches (159 mm) at Fairhaven. The accumulation at New Bedford ranked Arthur as the ninth wettest tropical cyclone on record in the state. Massachusetts State Police shut down access to parts of Interstate 195, Massachusetts Route 18, and U.S. Route 6 as a precaution. Nearby in Fairhaven, Adams Street was inundated and inaccessible, while the heavy rainfall resulted in flash flooding at New Bedford; as a result, a flash flood emergency was imposed by the National Weather Service. In addition, ferry service to and from Martha's Vineyard and Nantucket was suspended. Minor flooding also led to road closures around Boston, including the Interstate 93 tunnel near Leverett Circle. The New Bedford Whaling Museum was also flooded, inundated under 20 inches (510 mm) of water. Several boats were beached, and some flooding occurred at Cape Cod. NSTAR reported 8,451 outages, 7,500 of them on Cape Cod, while National Grid recorded 1,900, of which 1,400 affected customers in Middlesex County. Moisture from Arthur also aided in the development of damaging thunderstorms across western Massachusetts. Total losses in the state amounted to $889,000. Heavy rain forced a postponement of a game between the Boston Red Sox and Baltimore Orioles.

In Maine, tropical storm-force wind gusts downed numerous trees and power lines across eastern portions of the state. Winds on the mainland gusted to 58 mph (93 km/h) while Machias Seal Island observed 71 mph (114 km/h). Outages in Maine affected 20,000–25,000 residences, primarily in Hancock and Washington counties. About 2,800 Central Maine Power customers and 4,390 Emera Maine patrons lost power, mostly due to overturned trees and branches throughout the state. Locally significant damage took place in Aroostook County where heavy rains enabled winds aloft to mix down to the surface. Alongside the winds heavy rainfall affected the state, with a maximum of 6.48 inches (165 mm) near Whiting. Effects from the rains were negligible, with only minor stream flooding reported in Hancock and Washington Counties. Further inland in Vermont, 1,600 customers lost power.

=== Atlantic Canada and Quebec ===
Post-tropical Cyclone Arthur over The Maritimes on July 5

Powerful winds gusted up to 75 mph (120 km/h) across much of Nova Scotia, with a confirmed peak value of 87 mph (140 km/h) in Greenwood and an unconfirmed value of 112 mph (181 km/h) in Yarmouth. Arthur knocked out power to more than 290,000 individuals in the Maritimes; 144,000 of those were customers of Nova Scotia Power (NSP), and 1,500 of Maritime Electric on Prince Edward Island. In New Brunswick, power outages affected upwards of 140,000 individuals, of which 52,000 were situated near Fredericton, forcing the closure of the local University of New Brunswick campus. Copious rainfall was recorded in southwestern parts of New Brunswick, with 5.91 in (150 mm) measured at Gagetown. Flooding at Saint John, New Brunswick made two local streets inaccessible, while winds downed electrical poles in Fredericton. In Onslow, Nova Scotia, firefighters rescued a man trapped under a tree limb, while a sailboat capsized at Charlottetown harbor and another was washed out to sea. The hurricane forced temporary suspension of the MV Nova Star ferry service between Yarmouth, Nova Scotia and Portland, Maine. The storm caused flight delays and cancellations at Halifax Stanfield International Airport, while LaHave and Tancook Island ferries were shut down; in addition, access to the A. Murray MacKay Bridge was restricted to smaller vehicles. In Stratford, Prince Edward Island, a woman died after being struck by a door that was caught by a gust of wind, and in Woodstock, New Brunswick, a man died when his oxygen support was cut off during a power outage. In some parts of Nova Scotia, damage to the electrical grid was reported to be the worst since Hurricane Juan in 2003. Damage throughout New Brunswick amounted to at least C$12.6 million (US$11.8 million).

Effects from Arthur extended as far away as Quebec, where topographic wind enhancement occurred. Gusts of 50 to 62 mph (80 to 100 km/h) affected the Gaspésie–Îles-de-la-Madeleine region. Locally heavy rains fell in some parts of the province, with maximum amounts reaching 3.1 in (80 mm). The heaviest damage took place along the Chaleur Bay. Numerous trees and power lines were downed by the storm, leaving 23,000 Hydro Québec customers without electricity. A portion of Quebec Route 132 near Carleton-sur-Mer was temporarily shut down due to fallen debris. Severe flooding impacted Mont-Louis, with 40 homes affected, culverts washed away, and roads rendered impassable. A portion of Quebec Route 198 near the area was washed away. In nearby Marsoui, water and sewer service was disrupted with damage estimated in excess of C$4 million (US$3.75 million).

== Aftermath ==
If this is the most reliable infrastructure in the history of this company, I'd hate to see when it was vulnerable.

— Nova Scotia Premier Stephen McNeil, July 11, 2014

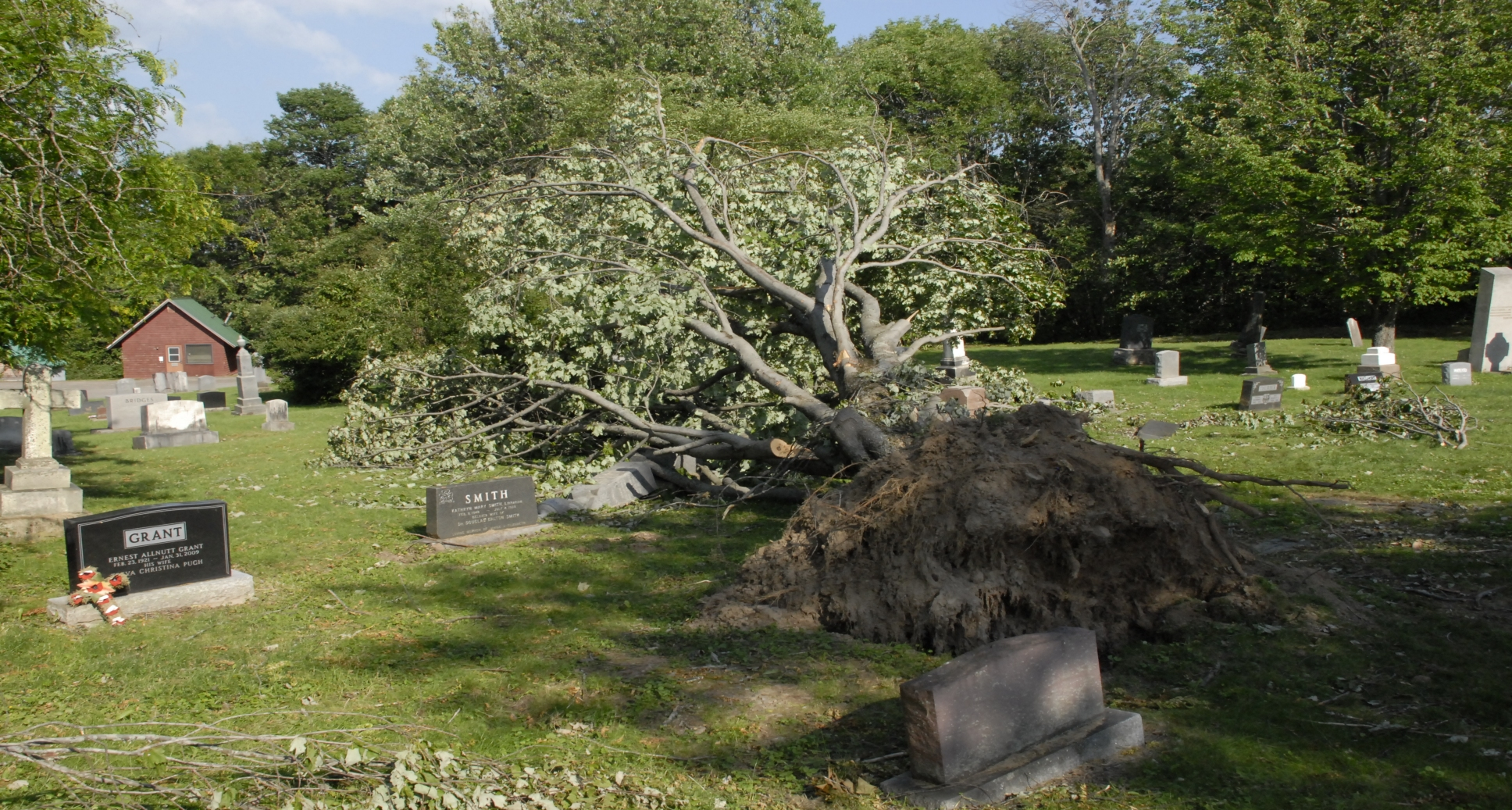
Damage from the remnants of Arthur at the Forest Hill Cemetery in Fredericton, New Brunswick where officials estimated a loss of about 10,000 trees in "The City of Stately Elms"

Damage cause by Arthur at Frost Park in Yarmouth.

Power outages across Nova Scotia lasted for a week after the storm's passage. This prompted numerous complaints from residents and officials, both criticizing NSP for their slow response. On July 9, NSP President and CEO Bob Hanf issued a public apology for the communication breakdown between his company and customers. By July 11, 2,400 customers remained without electricity with 187 crews working to restore it. The delay in restoration prompted numerous complaints from residents and Nova Scotia Premier Stephen McNeil condemned NSP's response as "inexcusable." McNeil ordered a review of the company to be made by provincial regulators. He and Energy Minister Andrew Younger agreed that there was a total failure of communication, namely through their website, between NSP and residents. One resident in Annapolis Valley stated that the company continuously told her power would be restored soon, when it ultimately took five days for it to return. NSP stated that in the four years prior to Arthur, C$70 million (US$65.7 million) had been spent on improving the electrical infrastructure; however, the storm was of a severity beyond any other since Hurricane Juan.

Similar issues occurred in New Brunswick where 18,000 customers remained without power through July 11. More than 310 crews remained deployed throughout the province with electricity expected to be fully restored by the following week. Costs to repair the power grid were estimated in excess of C$12 million (US$11.3 million). There was criticism that New Brunswick Power did not appropriately prepare for the storm and actually requested assistance from other public power companies and private contractors after the storm had struck. Two public buildings in Fredericton were utilized as recharging centers for residents to charge their phones and shower. An estimated 6,000 people took advantage of this through July 10. Shaved ice was later distributed from the Grant-Harvey Centre in the city while several waste disposal sites were opened for residents to get rid of spoiled food from power outages. Gaëtan Thomas, president and chief executive officer of NB Power, likened the effects of Arthur in the region to Hurricane Katrina along the United States Gulf Coast in August 2005. He referenced that during Katrina, 50 percent of the affected region lost power, while in the wake of Arthur 57 percent of New Brunswick was in the dark over a similar geographic area. Earlier cuts to the company's tree-trimming budget were cited as a possible cause in the scale of damage. As such, their budget for trimming in 2015 was increased from C$6 million to C$8 million.

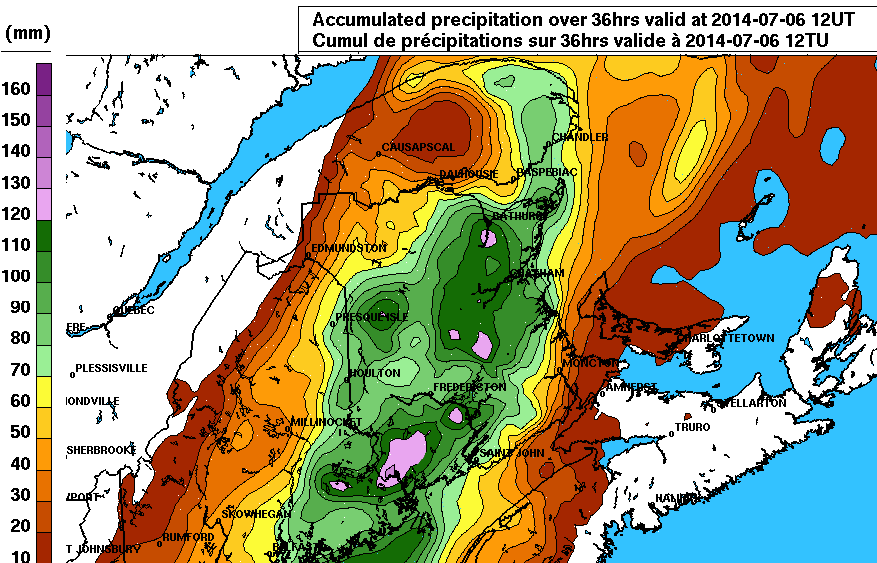
Rainfall accumulations from Hurricane Arthur across eastern Canada and Maine (in French)

Emergency management officials in Fredericton stated that it could be years before the city fully recovered from the storm. Power restoration in the province reached over 99 percent on July 16 with only 750 customers still out. However, a thunderstorm that evening revealed the weak nature of the power grid as outages jumped back over 4,000. The following week, Energy Minister Craig Leonard rebutted claims that a public review of NB Power was necessary, despite the longevity and severity of the power outages. New Brunswick's Liberal and Green parties both supported an independent review of the company, while Leonard claimed only an internal review was necessary. The total cost to restore and repair damage to the power grid wrought by the storm amounted to C$8.4 million (US$7.9 million). This ranked it as the second-costliest event for Nova Scotia Power from a tropical cyclone, only behind Hurricane Juan. New Brunswick Power reported even greater losses from Arthur with damage amounting to C$23 million (US$21.6 million). This marked the costliest disaster in the company's history, surpassing the December 2013 ice storm. In light of the severe damage, NB Power allocated an extra C$5.1 million (US$4.8 million) for tree trimming during the 2014–2014 fiscal year.

By July 9, 11 municipalities across Quebec were declared disaster areas and made eligible for federal funding. Ten more municipalities were placed under this declaration on July 11 following further damage assessments. The Canadian Red Cross provided residents in Marsoui with food and aid. Quebec Premier Philippe Couillard allocated C$100,000 in aid for the affected areas and promised further funding.

A few weeks after the storm, a severe outbreak of fire blight, a bacterial infection, occurred in the Annapolis Valley of Nova Scotia, affecting as many as 80 percent of the Valley's apple orchards. The storm was blamed for causing microscopic cracks in leaves, which allowed airborne bacteria to enter the plants.

== See also ==
- List of North Carolina hurricanes
- Timeline of the 2014 Atlantic hurricane season
