= 2014 Atlantic hurricane season =

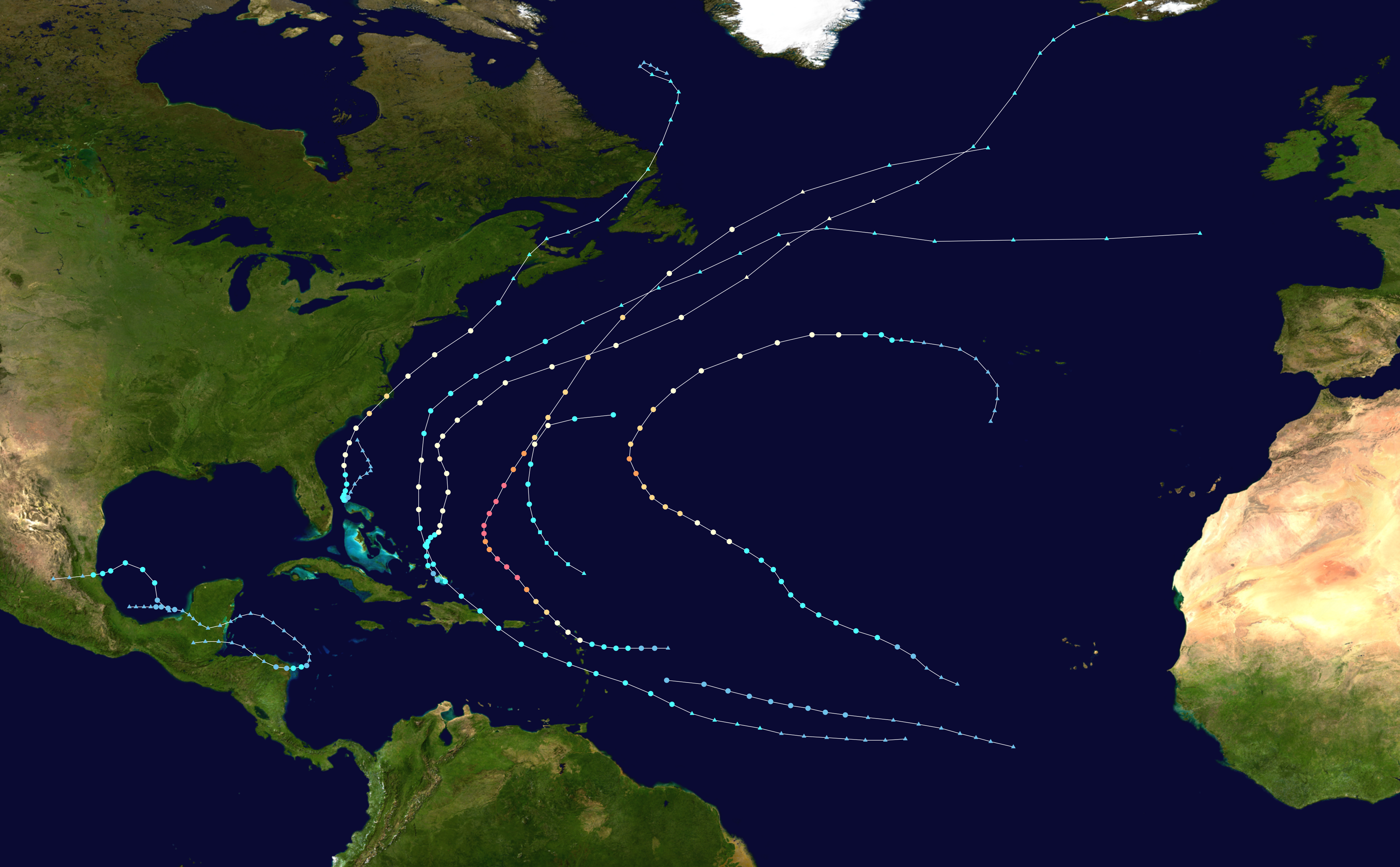
- Season summary map

Seasonal boundaries
- First system formed: July 1, 2014
- Last system dissipated: October 28, 2014

Strongest storm
- Name: Gonzalo
  - Maximum winds: 145 mph (230 km/h) (1-minute sustained)
  - Lowest pressure: 940 mbar (hPa; 27.76 inHg)

Seasonal statistics
- Total depressions: 9
- Total storms: 8
- Hurricanes: 6
- Major hurricanes (Cat. 3+): 2
- ACE: 66.7
- Total fatalities: 21 total
- Total damage: ≥ $382.5 million (2014 USD)

Related articles
- Timeline of the 2014 Atlantic hurricane season; 2014 Pacific hurricane season; 2014 Pacific typhoon season; 2014 North Indian Ocean cyclone season

The 2014 Atlantic hurricane season was a well below-average hurricane season that is currently the most recent to have fewer than 10 tropical depressions or named storms, despite the number of hurricanes and major hurricanes (Note: A major hurricane is a storm that ranks as Category 3 or higher on the Saffir–Simpson hurricane wind scale.) being overall average. It produced nine tropical cyclones, eight of which became named storms; six storms became hurricanes and two intensified further into major hurricanes. The season officially began on June 1, and ended on November 30. These dates historically describe the period each year when most tropical cyclones form in the Atlantic basin. The first storm of the season, Arthur, developed on July 1, while the final storm, Hanna, dissipated on October 28, about a month prior to the end of the season.

Most major forecasting agencies predicted that below-average activity would occur in this season due to unfavorable conditions linked with the expected development of a strong El Niño. While the predicted El Niño did not develop until October 2014, unfavorable conditions still were established across the basin, suppressing activity. Although every named storm impacted land, overall effects were minimal. Arthur caused one indirect fatality and $16.8 million (2014 USD) (Note: All damage figures are in 2014 USD, unless otherwise noted) in damage after striking North Carolina and becoming the first Category 2 hurricane to make landfall in the United States since 2008's Hurricane Ike, and its remnants moving across Atlantic Canada. Hurricane Bertha brushed the Lesser Antilles but its impacts were relatively minor. Three deaths occurred offshore the United States and one fatal injury was reported off the coast of the United Kingdom. Hurricane Cristobal caused two deaths each in Haiti and the Dominican Republic and one in Turks and Caicos Islands, all due to flooding. Rip currents affected Maryland and New Jersey, resulting in one fatality in each state. The remnants of Cristobal were responsible for three indirect deaths in the United Kingdom. Tropical Storm Dolly made landfall in eastern Mexico and triggered flooding due to heavy rains, leaving minor impact. Hurricane Edouard caused two deaths near the coast of Maryland due to strong rip currents.

Fay struck Bermuda and caused about $3.8 million in damage. Hurricane Gonzalo was the most intense hurricane of the season. A powerful Atlantic hurricane, Gonzalo had destructive impacts in the Lesser Antilles and Bermuda, and it was also the first Category 4 hurricane since Ophelia in 2011 and the strongest in the basin since Igor in 2010. It caused three fatalities in the Lesser Antilles and at least $200 million in damage in Bermuda. The remnants brought flooding and strong winds in Europe, causing three deaths in the United Kingdom. With two hurricanes striking Bermuda, this was the first season featuring more than one hurricane landfall on the island. The last storm of the season, Tropical Storm Hanna, made landfall over Central America in late October producing minimal impact.

== Seasonal forecasts ==
Predictions of tropical activity in the 2014 season
Source	Date	Named storms	Hurricanes	Major hurricanes	Ref
Average (1981–2010)		12.1	6.4	2.7
Record high activity		30	15	7†
Record low activity		1	0†	0†
TSR	December 12, 2013	14	6	3
WSI	March 24, 2014	11	5	2
TSR	April 7, 2014	12	5	2
CSU	April 10, 2014	9	3	1
NCSU	April 16, 2014	8–11	4–6	1–3
UKMO	May 16, 2014	10*	6*	N/A
NOAA	May 22, 2014	8–13	3–6	1–2
FSU COAPS	May 29, 2014	5–9	2–6	1–2
CSU	July 31, 2014	10	4	1
TSR	August 5, 2014	9–15	4–8	1–3
NOAA	August 7, 2014	7–12	3–6	0–2
	Actual activity	8	6	2
* June–November only † Most recent of several such occurrences. (See all)

In advance of, and during, each hurricane season, several forecasts of hurricane activity are issued by national meteorological services, scientific agencies, and noted hurricane experts. These include forecasters from the United States National Oceanic and Atmospheric Administration (NOAA)'s National Hurricane and Climate Prediction Center, Tropical Storm Risk, the United Kingdom's Met Office, and Philip J. Klotzbach, William M. Gray and their associates at Colorado State University (CSU). The forecasts include weekly and monthly changes in significant factors that help determine the number of tropical storms, hurricanes, and major hurricanes within a particular year. According to NOAA and CSU, the average Atlantic hurricane season between 1981 and 2010 contained roughly 12 tropical storms, six hurricanes, three major hurricanes, and an accumulated cyclone energy (ACE) index of 66–103 units. Broadly speaking, ACE is a measure of the power of a tropical or subtropical storm multiplied by the length of time it existed. Therefore, a storm with a longer duration or stronger intensity, such as Gonzalo, will have high values of ACE. It is only calculated for full advisories on specific tropical and subtropical systems reaching or exceeding wind speeds of 39 mph (63 km/h). Accordingly, tropical depressions are not included here. After the storm has dissipated, typically after the end of the season, the NHC reexamines the data, and produces a final report on each storm. These revisions can lead to a revised ACE total either upward or downward compared to the operational value. NOAA typically categorizes a season as either above-average, average, or below-average based on the cumulative ACE Index, but the number of tropical storms, hurricanes, and major hurricanes within a hurricane season are considered occasionally as well.

=== Pre-season forecasts ===
On December 13, 2013, Tropical Storm Risk (TSR), a public consortium consisting of experts on insurance, risk management, and seasonal climate forecasting at University College London, issued their first outlook on seasonal hurricane activity during the 2014 season. Their report called for a near-normal year, with 14 (±4) tropical storms, 6 (±3) hurricanes, 3 (±2) intense hurricanes, and a cumulative ACE index of 106 (±58) units. The basis for such included slightly stronger than normal trade winds and slightly warmer than normal sea surface temperatures across the Caribbean Sea and tropical North Atlantic. A few months later, on March 24, 2014, Weather Services International (WSI), a subsidiary company of The Weather Channel, released their first outlook, calling for 11 named storms, 5 hurricanes, and 2 major hurricanes. Two factors—cooler-than-average waters in the eastern Atlantic, and the likelihood of an El Niño developing during the summer of 2014—were expected to negate high seasonal activity.

On April 7, TSR issued their second extended-range forecast for the season, lowering the predicted numbers to 12 (±4) named storms, 5 (±3) hurricanes, 2 (±2) major hurricanes, and an ACE index of 75 (±57) units. Three days later, CSU issued their first outlook for the year, predicting activity below the 1981–2010 average. Citing a likely El Niño of at least moderate intensity and cooler-than-average tropical Atlantic sea surface temperatures, the organization predicted nine named storms, three hurricanes, one major hurricane, and an ACE index of 55 units. The probability of a major hurricane making landfall on the United States or tracking through the Caribbean Sea was expected to be lower than average.

On May 16, the United Kingdom Met Office (UKMO) issued a forecast of a slightly below-average season. It predicted 10 named storms with a 70% chance that the number would be between 7 and 13 and 6 hurricanes with a 70% chance that the number would be between 3 and 9. It also predicted an ACE index of 84 with a 70% chance that the index would be in the range 47 to 121. NOAA released their pre-season forecasts on May 22 and called for a 70% chance that there would be between 8 and 13 named storms, 3 to 6 hurricanes, and 1 to 2 major hurricanes. On May 29, the Florida State University Center for Ocean-Atmospheric Prediction Studies, FSU COAPS, issued its first and only prediction for the season. The organization called for five to nine named storms, of which two to six would further intensify into hurricanes; one to two of the hurricanes would reach major hurricane intensity. In addition, an ACE index of 60 units was forecast.

=== Mid-season predictions ===
In July and August, CSU, TSR, and NOAA released similar outlooks for the remainder of the season. CSU increased its prediction on July 31 to ten named storms, four hurricanes, and one major hurricane, which was unchanged from its forecast on May 23. The forecast team noted that conditions for tropical cyclogenesis appeared "detrimental", with abnormally cold sea surface temperatures, higher than average sea-level pressures, and strong vertical wind shear. TSR issued another forecast on July 5, indicated that there would be nine to fifteen named storms, four to eight hurricanes, and one to three major hurricanes, citing conditions similar to those forecast by CSU. Two days later, NOAA revised its predictions and called for seven to twelve named storms, three to six hurricanes, and zero to two major hurricanes. NOAA noted similar atmospheric and oceanic conditions, but also indicated a weaker African monsoon, a stable atmosphere, and sinking air.

== Seasonal summary ==
The Atlantic hurricane season officially began on June 1, 2014. It was a below average season in which nine tropical cyclones formed. Eight of the nine designated cyclones attained tropical storm status, the fewest since the 1997 Atlantic hurricane season. Of the eight tropical storms, six reached at least Category 1 hurricane intensity. The 2014 season extended the period without major hurricane landfalls in the United States to nine years, with the last such system being Hurricane Wilma in 2005. The lack of activity was attributed to an atmospheric circulation that favored dry, sinking air over the Atlantic Ocean and strong wind shear over the Caribbean Sea. Additionally, sea surface temperatures were near-average. A few notable events occurred during the season. Arthur made landfall between Cape Lookout and Cape Hatteras as a Category 2 hurricane, becoming the first U.S. landfalling cyclone of that intensity since Hurricane Ike in 2008. Arthur also became the earliest known hurricane to strike the North Carolina coastline on record, doing so on July 4. In October, Fay became the first hurricane to make landfall on Bermuda since Emily in 1987. With Gonzalo striking the island only four days later, 2014 became the first season on record in which more than one hurricane struck Bermuda. Four hurricanes and two tropical storms made landfall during the season and caused 21 deaths and at least $233 million in damage. Hurricane Cristobal also caused fatalities, though it did not strike land. The Atlantic hurricane season officially ended on November 30, 2014.

Tropical cyclogenesis commenced with the development of Arthur on July 1. The system intensified into the first hurricane of the year early on July 3. Both events occurred ahead of the respective long-term climatological average date: July 9 for first named storm, and August 10 for first hurricane. Later that month, a tropical depression developed over the eastern Atlantic, but dissipated after only two days. There were also two tropical cyclones in August, with the development of hurricanes Bertha and Cristobal. Despite being the climatological peak of hurricane season, only two additional systems originated in September – Tropical Storm Dolly and Hurricane Edouard. In October, three storms developed, including hurricanes Fay and Gonzalo and Tropical Storm Hanna. The most intense tropical cyclone – Hurricane Gonzalo – peaked with maximum sustained winds of 145 mph (235 km/h) on October 16 which is a Category 4 on the Saffir–Simpson hurricane wind scale. It was the first Category 4 hurricane since Hurricane Ophelia in 2011. The final tropical cyclone of the season was Hanna, which dissipated on October 28.

The season's activity was reflected with an Accumulated Cyclone Energy (ACE) rating of 66.7. This was nearly double that of the previous season, but still well below the 1981–2010 median of 92. The ACE value in October was higher than August and September combined, which has not occurred since 1963.

== Systems ==
=== Hurricane Arthur ===
- Category 2 hurricane (SSHWS)
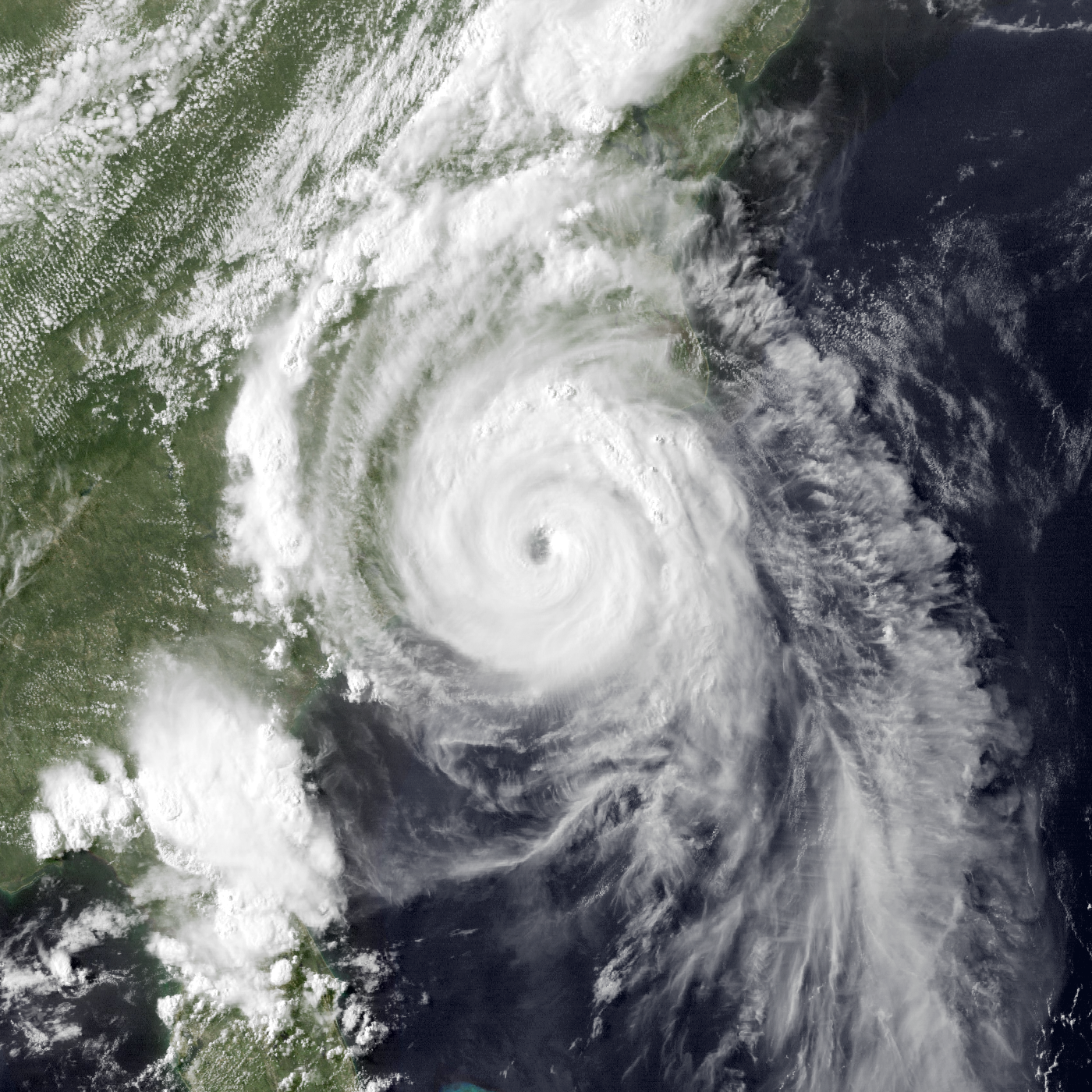
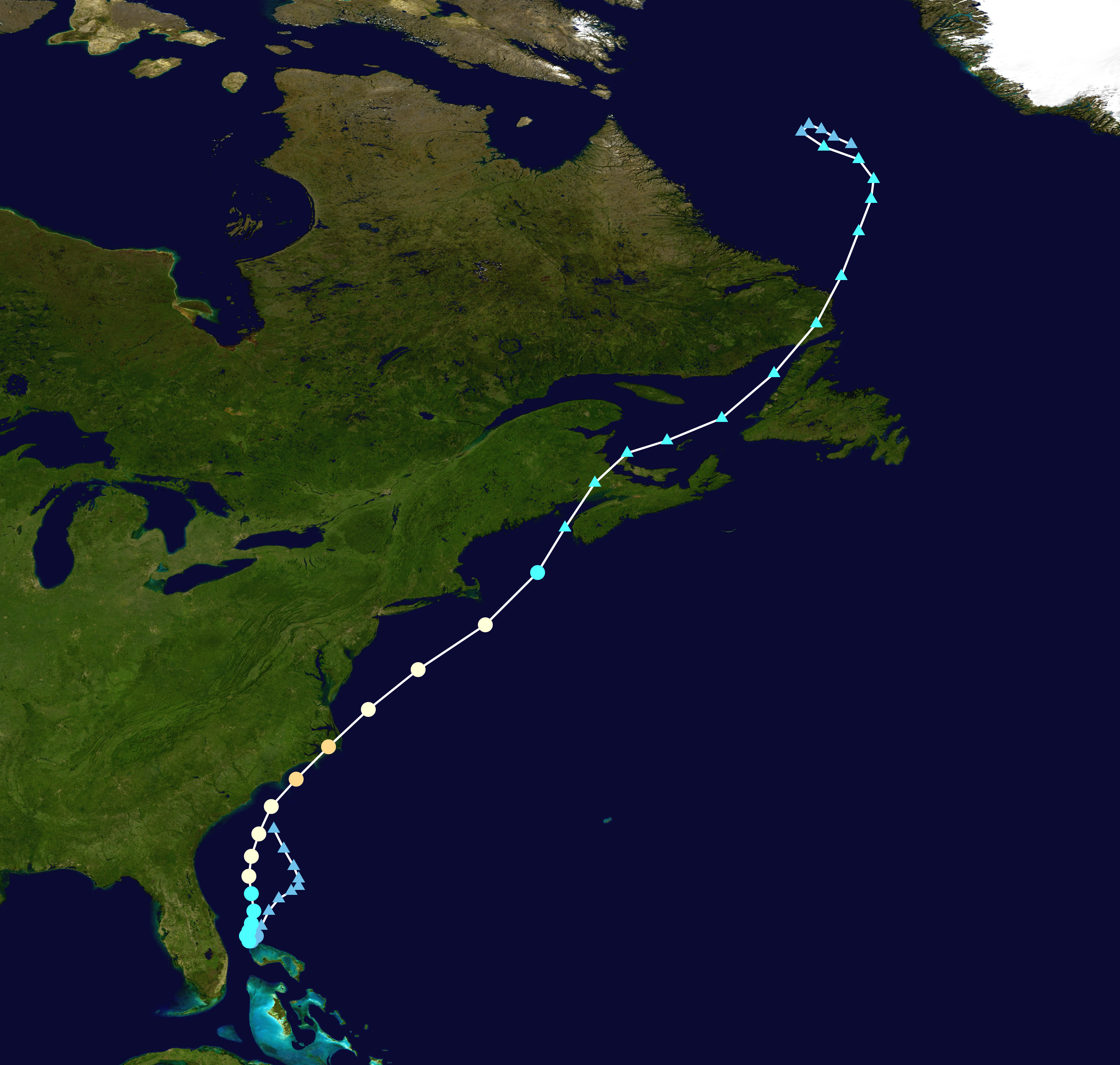
- Duration: July 1 – July 5
- Peak intensity: 100 mph (155 km/h) (1-min); 973 mbar (hPa)

On June 25, a low-pressure area formed within a mesoscale convective complex over the northwestern Gulf of Mexico. After crossing Georgia and South Carolina, it became absorbed by a weak frontal boundary that drifted south-southeastward. An area of low pressure developed off the Southeast United States by June 28, eventually leading to the formation of a tropical depression by 00:00 UTC on July 1. Amid a generally favorable environment, the depression intensified into Tropical Storm Arthur at 12:00 UTC that same day and further to a Category 1 hurricane by 00:00 UTC on July 3. An approaching mid-level trough directed the storm north-northeastward as it continued to intensify, and Arthur reached its peak as a Category 2 hurricane with winds of 100 mph (160 km/h) at 00:00 UTC on July 4. A few hours later, it moved ashore just west of Cape Lookout, North Carolina, becoming the earliest landfalling hurricane on record in the state. Following landfall, Arthur accelerated northeast across the western Atlantic while encountering an increasingly unfavorable environment, weakening to a tropical storm at 06:00 UTC on July 5 and transitioning into an extratropical cyclone six hours later. The post-tropical low eventually dissipated east of Labrador late on July 9.

As a developing tropical cyclone, Arthur produced light rainfall across the northwestern Bahamas. Maximum sustained winds peaked at 77 mph (124 km/h), with a peak gust of 101 mph (163 km/h), at Cape Lookout, and Oregon Inlet recorded a peak storm surge of 4.5 ft (1.4 m). At its height, Arthur knocked out power to 44,000 people in North Carolina, triggering Duke Energy to deploy over 500 personnel to restore electricity. Widespread rainfall totals of 6–8 in (150–200 mm) led to the inundation of numerous buildings in Manteo. As the storm passed offshore New England, sustained winds of 47 mph (76 km/h) and gusts up to 63 mph (101 km/h) were observed. Observed rainfall totals over a half foot required the issuance of a flash flood emergency for New Bedford, Massachusetts, while several roads were shut down in surrounding locations. After transitioning into an extratropical cyclone, Arthur knocked out power to more than 290,000 individuals across the Maritimes, with damage to the electrical grid considered the worst since Hurricane Juan in Nova Scotia. One person died after his oxygen support was cut off during a power outage. Hurricane-force gusts were observed in Nova Scotia, with tropical storm-force winds observed as far away as Quebec. Overall, Arthur caused at least $28.6 million in damage.

=== Tropical Depression Two ===
- Tropical depression (SSHWS)
- Duration: July 21 – July 23
- Peak intensity: 35 mph (55 km/h) (1-min); 1012 mbar (hPa)

A tropical wave emerged off the western coast of Africa on July 17. Steered westward, a small area of low pressure developed in association with the wave two days later. Convection steadily increased and organized, leading to the formation of a tropical depression by 12:00 UTC on July 21. The depression failed to intensify into a tropical storm amid an exceptionally dry and stable environment and instead degenerated into a trough by 18:00 UTC on July 23 while located east of the Lesser Antilles.

=== Hurricane Bertha ===
- Category 1 hurricane (SSHWS)
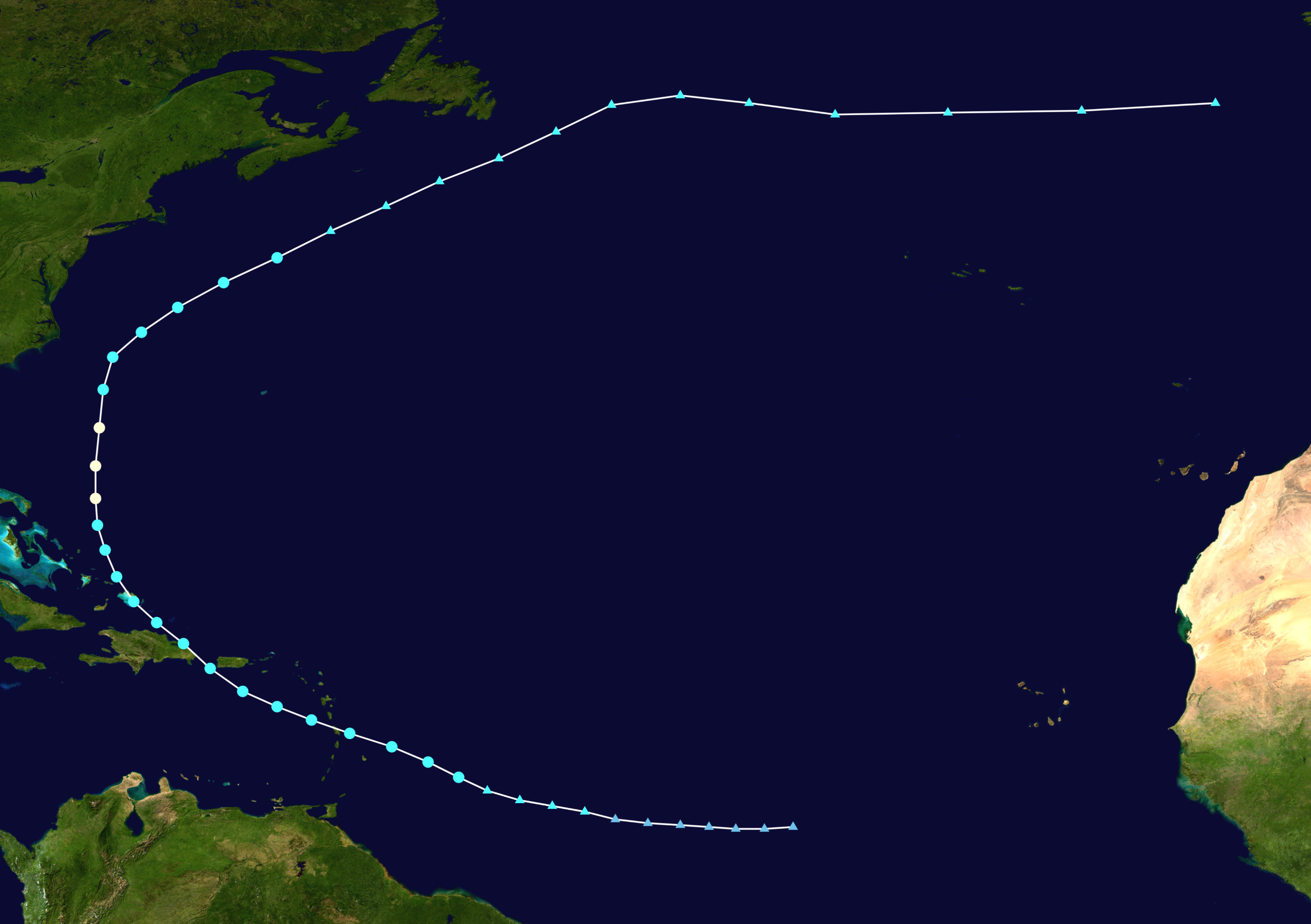
- Duration: August 1 – August 6
- Peak intensity: 80 mph (130 km/h) (1-min); 998 mbar (hPa)

On August 1, a tropical wave developed into Tropical Storm Bertha while roughly 345 mi (555 km) east-southeast of Barbados. A mostly disorganized cyclone, Bertha quickly moved across the Lesser Antilles, clipping the northern end of Martinique, later that day. During its trek across the eastern Caribbean Sea, its circulation became severely disrupted and it may have degenerated into a tropical wave. On August 3, it traversed the Mona Passage and moved over the Southeastern Bahamas where conditions favored development. Despite an overall ragged appearance on satellite imagery, data from hurricane hunters indicated it intensified to a hurricane on August 4; it acquired peak winds of 80 mph (130 km/h) that day. Turning north, and later northeast, Bertha soon weakened as it began to merge with an approaching trough to the west. This merger ultimately took place on August 6, at which time Bertha was declared extratropical well to the south of Nova Scotia.

As a tropical cyclone, Bertha's impact was relatively minor. In the Lesser Antilles, widespread power outages occurred along its path but no major damage or loss of life took place. Enhanced swells and rip currents associated with the hurricane resulted in three fatalities and dozens of rescues along the East Coast of the United States. After becoming an extratropical system, it had significant effects in Western Europe, with the United Kingdom being particularly hard hit. Unseasonably heavy rains triggered widespread flooding which shut down roads and prompted evacuations. One fatality took place offshore after a man suffered a fatal head injury on his yacht amid rough seas. On mainland Europe, a small tornado outbreak resulted in scattered structural damage in Belgium, France, and Germany.

=== Hurricane Cristobal ===
- Category 1 hurricane (SSHWS)
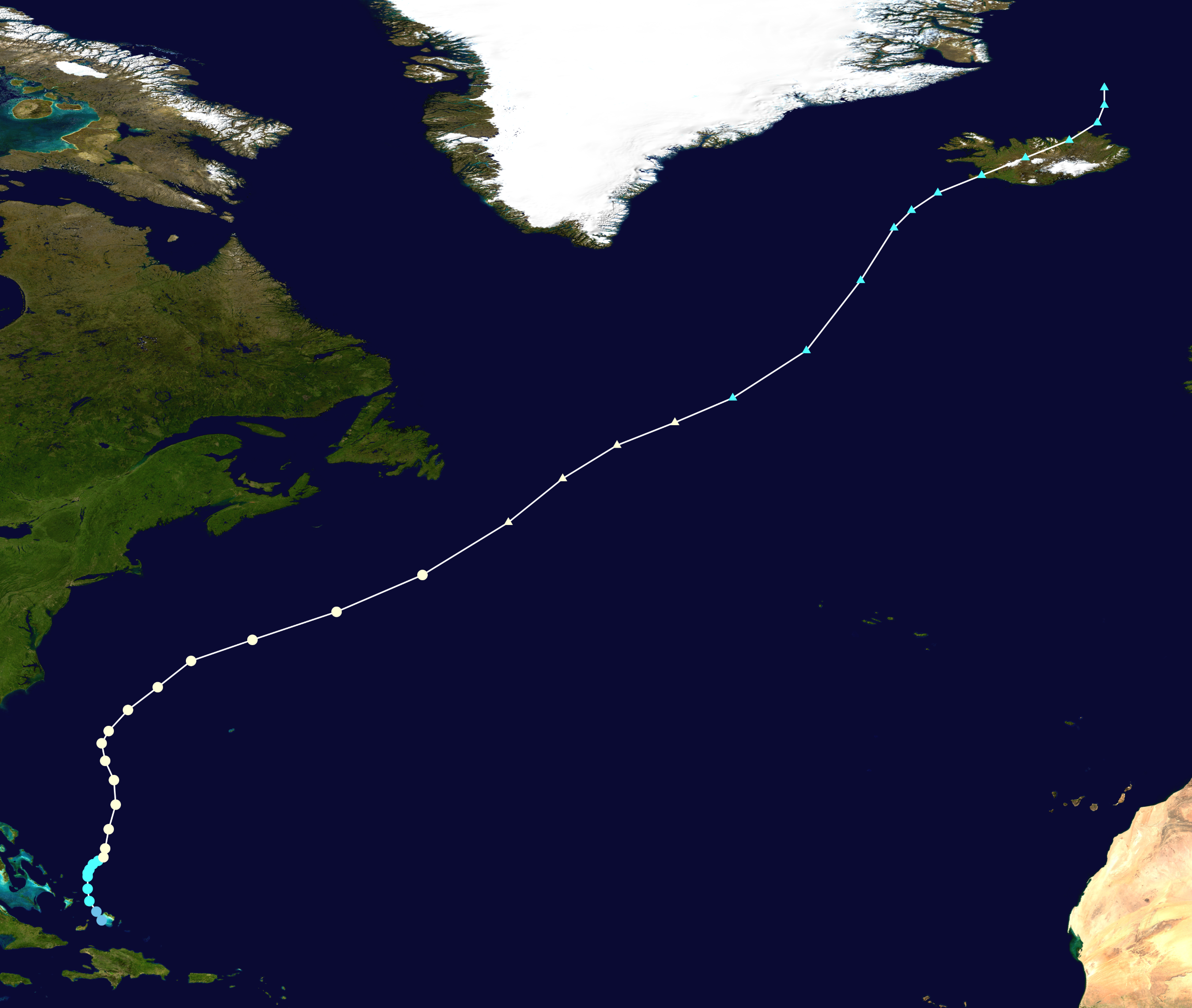
- Duration: August 23 – August 29
- Peak intensity: 85 mph (140 km/h) (1-min); 965 mbar (hPa)

A tropical wave and attendant region of convection developed into a tropical depression at 18:00 UTC on August 23 while located near Mayaguana in the Bahamas; twelve hours later, the depression intensified into Tropical Storm Cristobal. The newly formed cyclone turned northward following formation, directed toward a break in a subtropical ridge. Although located in an unfavorable environment, Cristobal steadily intensified and was upgraded to a Category 1 hurricane at 00:00 UTC on August 26 despite a partially exposed circulation and disorganized cloud pattern. As the hurricane turned east-northeastward the following day, its cloud pattern became much more symmetric and an eye became evident, yielding peak winds of 85 mph (135 km/h). Thereafter, a frontal boundary wrapped around the storm's circulation, transitioning the system into an extratropical cyclone by 12:00 UTC on August 29. The post-tropical low maintained hurricane-force winds while accelerating across the North Atlantic, finally merging with a second extratropical low north of Iceland by September 2.

The precursor of Cristobal and the storm itself dropped heavy precipitation on Puerto Rico, with 13.21 in (336 mm) of rain observed in the municipality of Tibes, bring drought relief to the island. The storm downed many trees and power lines and left more than 23,500 people without power and 8,720 without water. In Dominican Republic, large amounts of rainfall left several communities isolated, flooded at least 800 homes, and killed two people. Thousands of people were evacuated from their homes. In Haiti, mudslides and flooding rendered 640 families homeless and destroyed or severely damaged at least 34 homes. Two people who went missing were later presumed to have drowned. In the Turks and Caicos Islands, the storm produced over 10 in (250 mm) of precipitation on various islands. The international airport on Providenciales briefly closed due to flooding, where one drowning death occurred. Portions of North Caicos were inundated with up to 5 ft (1.5 m) of water. Along the East Coast of the United States, rip currents resulted in two deaths, one each in Maryland and New Jersey.

=== Tropical Storm Dolly ===
- Tropical storm (SSHWS)
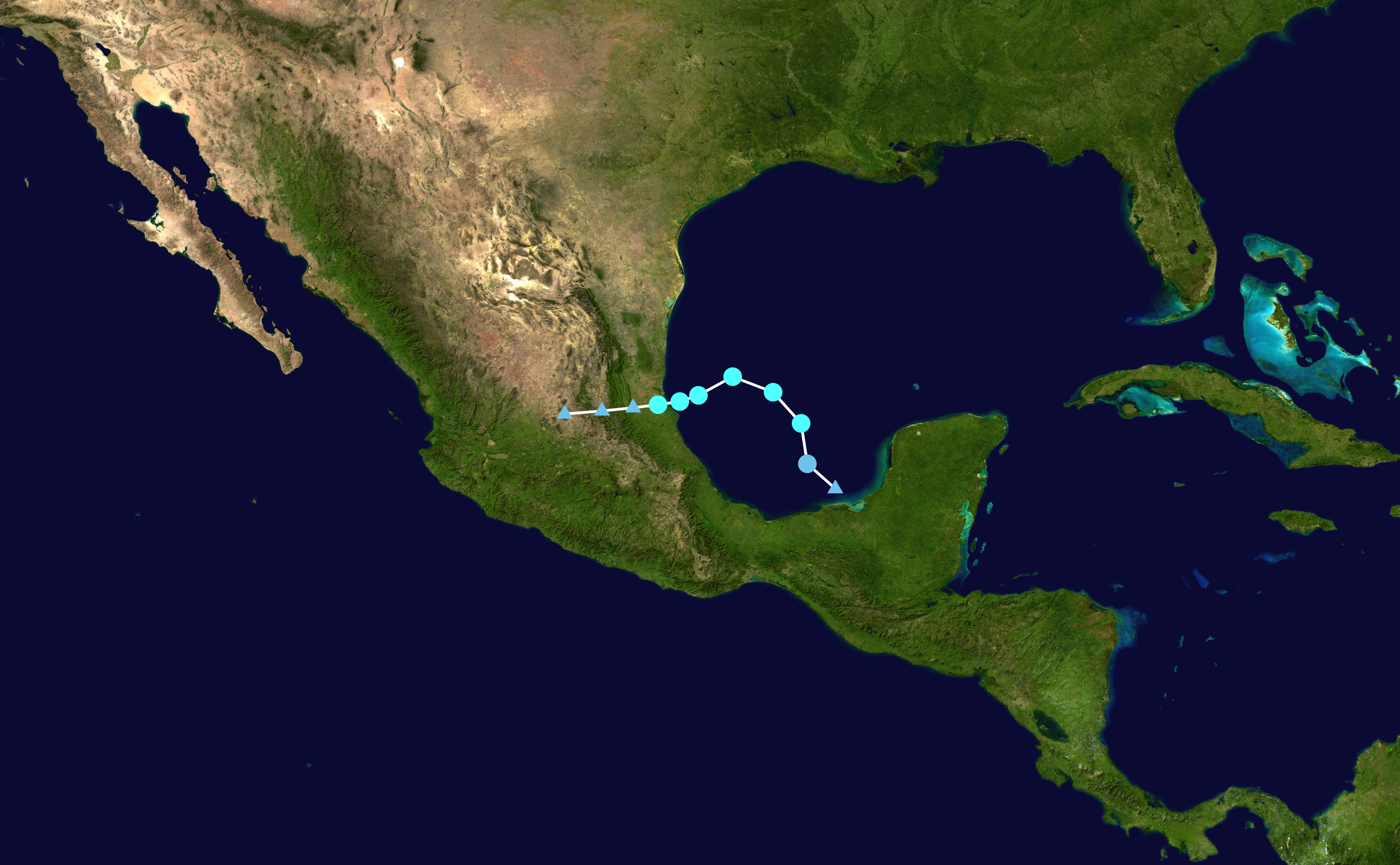
- Duration: September 1 – September 3
- Peak intensity: 50 mph (85 km/h) (1-min); 1000 mbar (hPa)

On August 19, a tropical wave emerged off the west coast of Africa. The system traversed the Atlantic over the next week with no signs of development. Convection finally increased once the wave entered the Caribbean Sea on August 27; however, it was not until August 30 when interaction with a Kelvin wave spurred organization. An area of low pressure consolidated within the system as it crossed the Yucatán Peninsula on August 31. Formation of a banding feature along the southeastern portion of the circulation on September 1 marked the system's transition into a tropical depression by 18:00 UTC while over the Bay of Campeche. Although situated over warm waters of 30 °C (86 °F), strong wind shear created an unfavorable environment and hindered intensification. During this formative stage, the depression tracked northward as its center relocated before turning to the northwest and later west. Early on September 2, the depression became Tropical Storm Dolly, reaching peak winds of 50 mph (80 km/h) around 12:00 UTC. A tight pressure gradient between Dolly and a ridge over the Gulf of Mexico created a large area of tropical storm winds along the east side of the cyclone. As it neared the coast, Dolly consisted of multiple rotating circulations, and it weakened slightly. Around 01:00 UTC on September 3, Dolly's pressure fell to 1000 mbar (hPa; 29.53 inHg) marking the storm's peak intensity. Dolly made landfall just south of Tampico at 04:00 UTC with winds of 45 mph (72 km/h). Once onshore, Dolly quickly degenerated into a remnant low as its circulation separated from all remaining convection. It dissipated early on September 4.

The Mexican government issued tropical storm warning from Tuxpan to Barra El Mezquital. Public schools and the Autonomous University of Tamaulipas suspended classes on September 2 and 3 in Tamaulipas and Veracruz. Officials opened 53 shelters for potential evacuees. Pemex temporarily suspended operations of two oil production plants. Between September 1–4, Dolly brought widespread heavy rains to Mexico, reaching 15.23 in (387 mm) in La Encantada, Tamaulipas. Flooding in Tamaulipas prompted residents to evacuate and utilize public shelters. A roof collapse at a ballpark injured two people. Losses from heavy rain in El Mante reached 7 million pesos (US$535,000), prompting a state of emergency. Total damage in the state amounted to 290.5 million pesos (US$22.2 million). Some residences temporarily lost power across Tamaulipas. Road collapses in Veracruz City damaged ten homes and four cars. One of these further threatened 40 homes in Infonavit Buena Vista within the city. A rockslide occurred in the remote community of El Tecomate. Flooding in Guanajuato caused notable disruptions and some damage. No observations of sustained tropical storm-force winds were received, though a gust of 48 mph (77 km/h) was observed in Barra del Tordo. Accordingly, wind damage was limited to Cabo Rojo. One death was indirectly attributed to Dolly. The remnants of Dolly brought widespread moisture to Southern Texas by September 5. Scattered thunderstorms developed across the region, with some producing damaging winds. More than 2 in (51 mm) of rain fell in Brownsville, causing street flooding. Dozens of Mexican fishing vessels sought refuge in the Port of Brownsville; however, two ran aground in the shipping channel and a third on South Padre Island. The United States Coast Guard attributed the mishaps to the sudden influx of ships. Southerly flow from Hurricane Norbert over the Pacific brought moisture from Dolly over the Southwestern United States, resulting in possible life-threatening flash flooding.

=== Hurricane Edouard ===
- Category 3 hurricane (SSHWS)
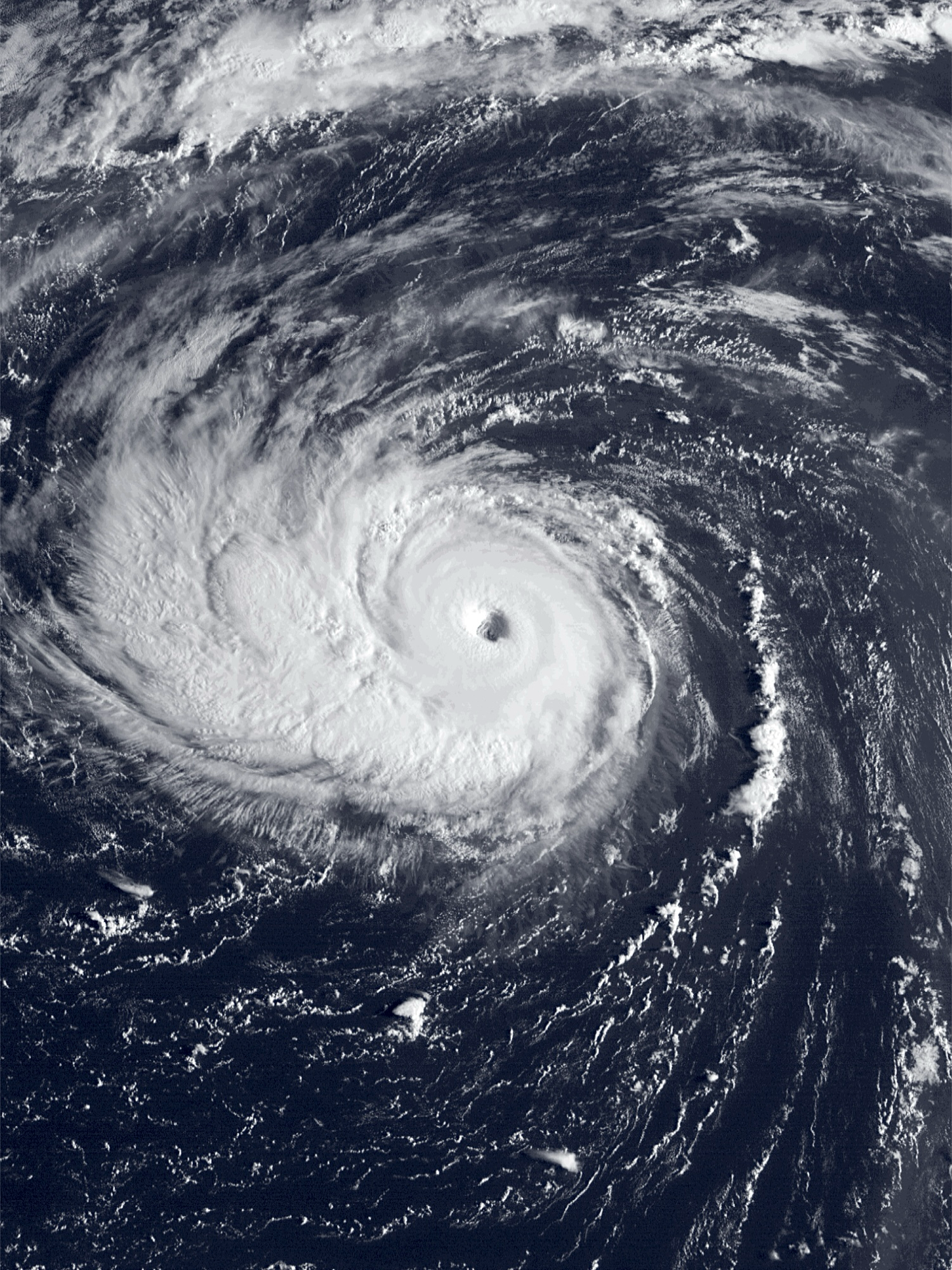
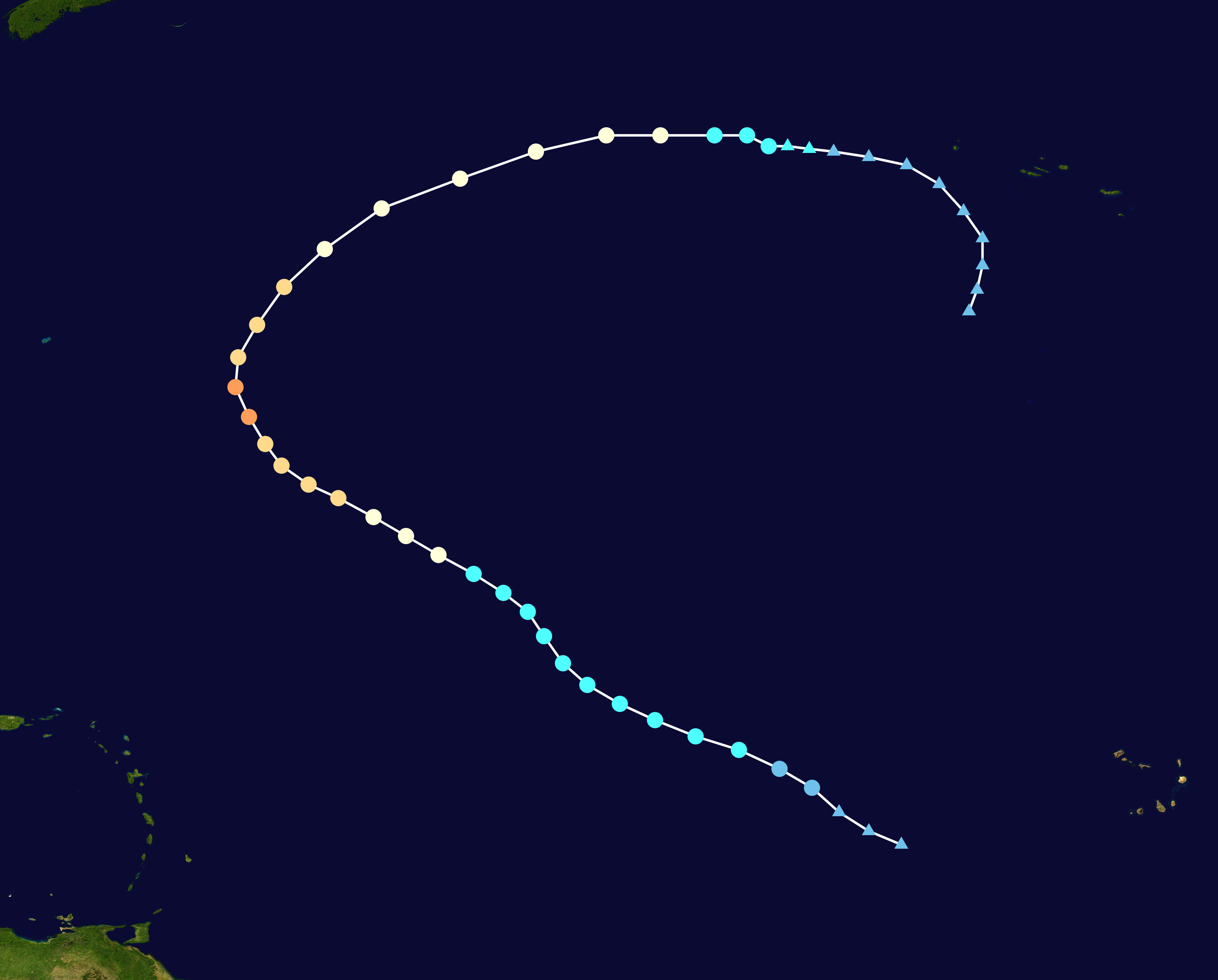
- Duration: September 11 – September 19
- Peak intensity: 120 mph (195 km/h) (1-min); 955 mbar (hPa)

A tropical wave accompanied by a broad area of low pressure exited the western coast of Africa on September 6, acquiring sufficient organization to be declared a tropical depression by 12:00 UTC on September 11. Twelve hours later, the depression intensified into Tropical Storm Edouard. The newly formed cyclone moved northwest, steered around a subtropical ridge to its northeast. The storm intensified in a generally favorable environment and became a hurricane by 12:00 UTC on September 14. With a well-defined eye surrounded by intense eyewall convection, Edouard further strengthened into a major hurricane early on September 16, attaining peak winds of 120 mph (195 km/h) at 12:00 UTC, the first major hurricane in the Atlantic since Hurricane Sandy in 2012. The cyclone abruptly weakened thereafter as it curved northeastward in advance of an upper-level trough, falling below hurricane intensity by 00:00 UTC on September 19 and degenerating into a remnant low eighteen hours later. The remnant low moved generally southward, merging with a frontal boundary well south-southwest of the Azores on September 21.

Though Edouard remained well away from land throughout its existence, large swells and dangerous rip currents affected much of the East Coast of the United States. Rip current warnings were issued on September 17 for Duval, Flagler, Nassau, and St. Johns counties in Florida and Camden and Glynn counties in Georgia. Waves in the area were forecast to reach 3 to 4 ft (0.91 to 1.22 m). On September 17, two men drowned off the coast of Ocean City, Maryland, due to strong rip currents. The Bermuda Weather Service noted the hurricane as a "potential threat"; however, Edouard remained several hundred miles away from the islands.

On September 16, several uncrewed drones designed by NOAA were launched by Hurricane Hunter aircraft while investigating Edouard. This marked the first time that drones were used in such a manner by NOAA. Unlike the crewed aircraft, the drones were able to fly to the lower-levels of hurricanes and investigate the more dangerous areas near the surface. Additionally, a NASA-operated Global Hawk flew into the storm, equipped with two experimental instruments: the Scanning High-resolution Interferometer Sounder (S-HIS) and Cloud Physics Lidar (CPL). The S-HIS provided measurements of temperature and relative humidity while the CPL was for studying aerosols and the structure of cloud layers within hurricanes.

=== Hurricane Fay ===
- Category 1 hurricane (SSHWS)
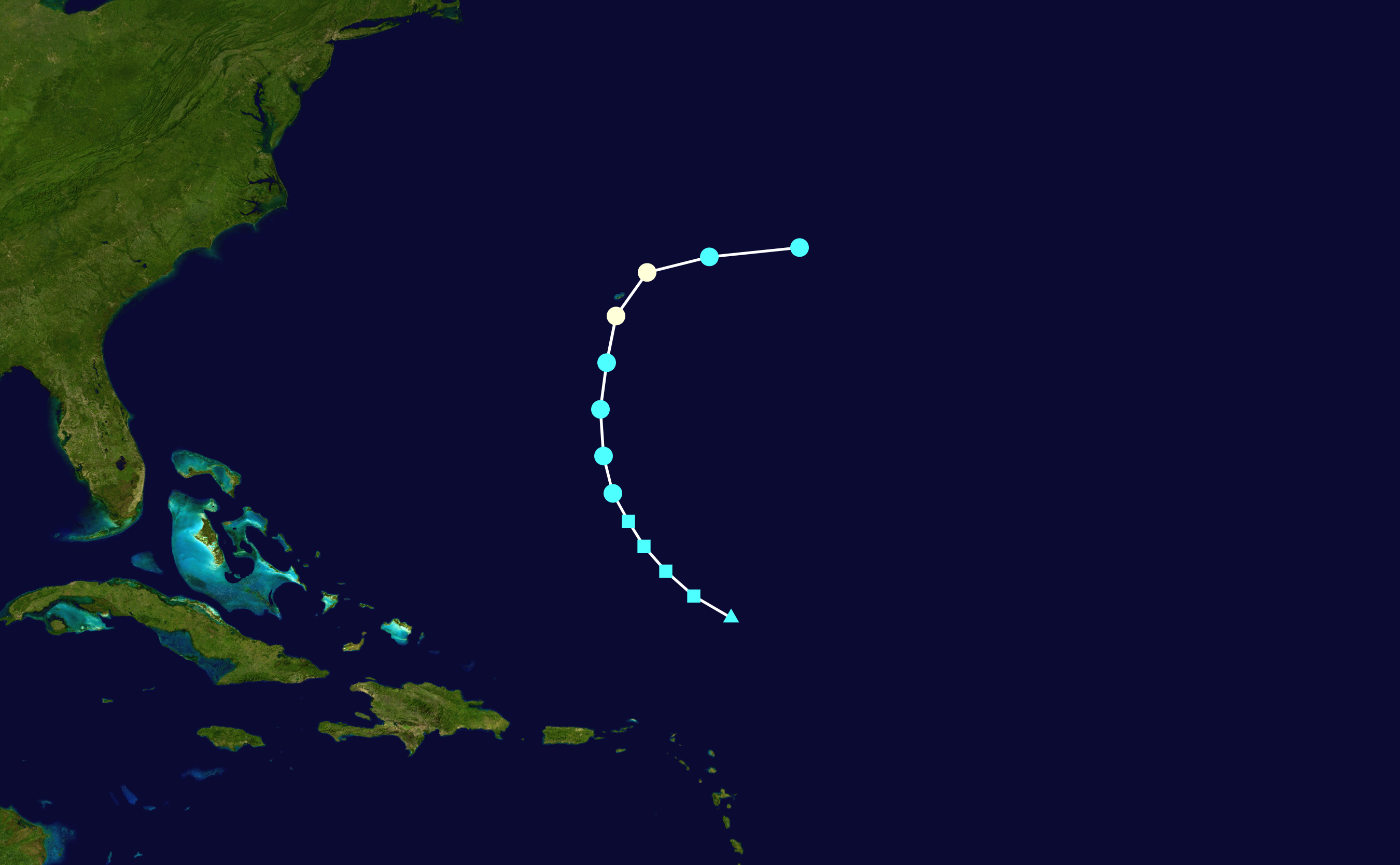
- Duration: October 10 – October 13
- Peak intensity: 80 mph (130 km/h) (1-min); 983 mbar (hPa)

A low-level disturbance was designated as Subtropical Storm Fay at 06:00 UTC on October 10 while located about 615 mi (990 km) south of Bermuda. Directed north-northwestward around a mid-level ridge across the central Atlantic, the system became dislocated from a cold-core low, allowing for a subsequent transition into a fully tropical storm by early on October 11. Fay continued to strengthen in spite of excessively strong wind shear as it accelerated north-northeast, becoming a hurricane as it approached Bermuda the next morning. With an asymmetric cloud pattern, the hurricane reached peak winds of 80 mph (130 km/h) and made landfall on the island at 08:10 UTC on October 12. An approaching shortwave further turned the system to the east-northeast while also acting to increase wind shear, causing Fay to begin weakening. It fell below hurricane intensity on October 12 and degenerated into an open trough by 06:00 UTC on October 13.

A few tropical cyclone warnings and watches were issued in anticipation of Fay's impact on Bermuda. Public schools were closed in advance of the storm. Despite its modest strength, Fay produced relatively extensive damage on Bermuda. Winds gusting over 80 mph (130 km/h) clogged roadways with downed trees and power poles, and left a majority of the island's electricity customers without power. The terminal building at L.F. Wade International Airport was severely flooded after the storm compromised its roof and sprinkler system. Immediately after the storm, 200 Bermuda Regiment soldiers were called to clear debris and assist in initial damage repairs. Cleanup efforts overlapped with preparations for the approach of the stronger Hurricane Gonzalo. There were concerns that debris from Fay could become airborne during Gonzalo and exacerbate future destruction. Overall, it is estimated that the hurricane left at least $3.8 million in damage.

=== Hurricane Gonzalo ===
- Category 4 hurricane (SSHWS)
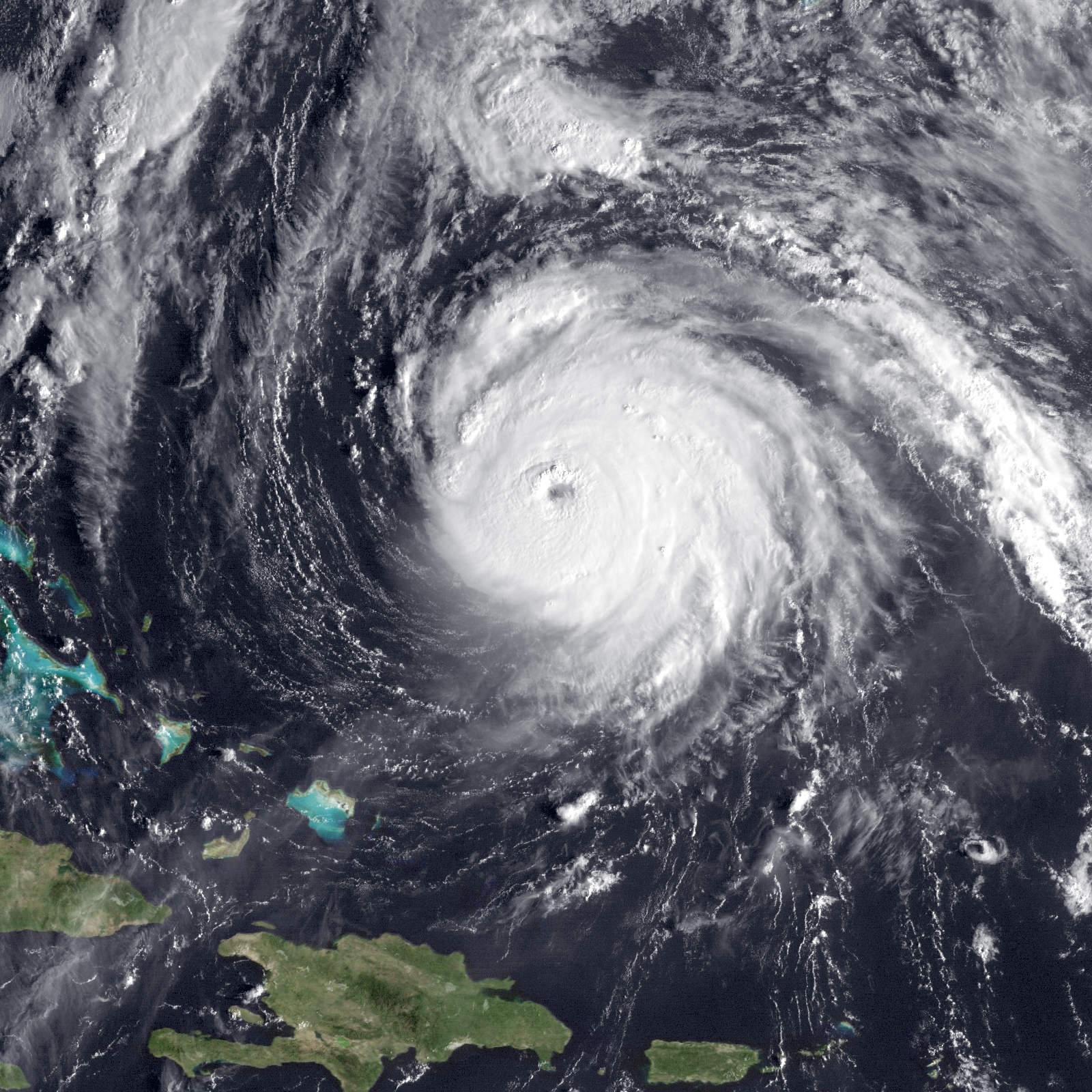
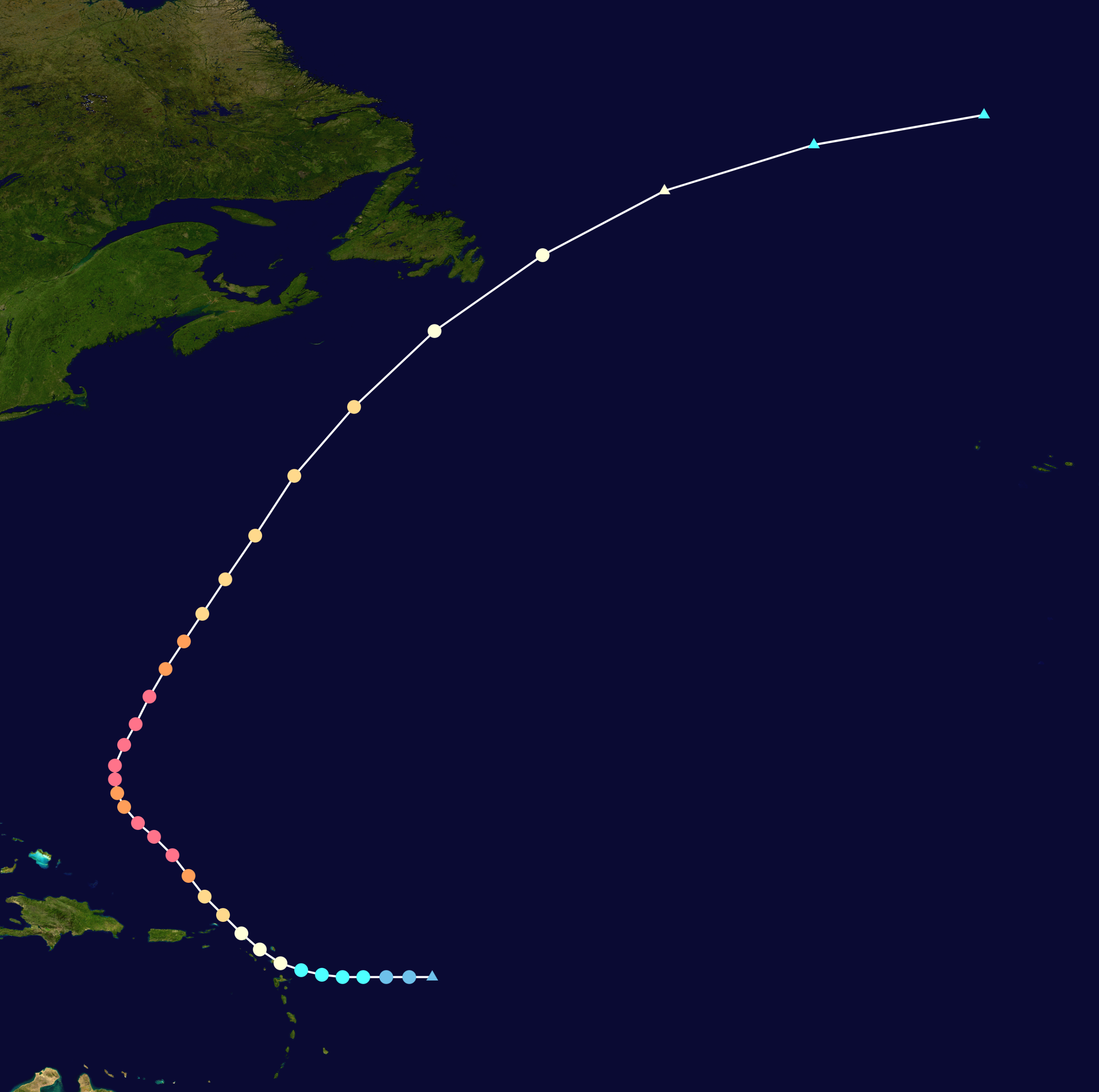
- Duration: October 12 – October 19
- Peak intensity: 145 mph (230 km/h) (1-min); 940 mbar (hPa)

A tropical depression formed about 390 mi (630 km) east of the Leeward Islands by 00:00 UTC on October 12 from a tropical wave that emerged off Africa on October 4. Twelve hours later, it intensified into Tropical Storm Gonzalo. Steered west and eventually west-northwest, the cyclone rapidly intensified amid favorable atmospheric dynamics, becoming a minimal hurricane by 12:00 UTC on October 13. After curving northwest and emerging into the southwestern Atlantic, Gonzalo continued its period of rapid intensification, becoming a major hurricane by 18:00 UTC on October 14 and a Category 4 hurricane six hours later. The hurricane underwent an eyewall replacement cycle the next day, but ultimately attained peak winds of 145 mph (235 km/h) and a minimum barometric pressure of 940 mbar (28 inHg) by 12:00 UTC on October 16. Late that afternoon, the effects of a second eyewall replacement cycle, cooler waters, and increased shear caused the storm to begin a steady weakening trend as it accelerated north-northeast ahead of an approaching trough. Gonzalo weakened below major hurricane intensity by 00:00 UTC on October 18 and made landfall in Bermuda with winds of 110 mph (175 km/h) six hours later. The cyclone continued north-northeast, transitioning into an extratropical cyclone by 18:00 UTC on October 19 while located roughly 460 mi (740 km) northeast of Cape Race, Newfoundland. The extratropical cyclone turned east-northeast and was absorbed by a cold front early on October 20.

Widespread impact was observed across the northeastern Caribbean Sea as Gonzalo moved through the region. Sustained winds of 67 mph (108 km/h), with gusts to 88 mph (142 km/h), were observed on Antigua, where downed trees blocked roads and damaged houses. Numerous fishing boats were destroyed and the island was subject to a widespread power outage. On Saint Martin, 37 docked boats were destroyed and the airport recorded sustained winds of 55 mph (90 km/h) with gusts to 94 mph (151 km/h). As Gonzalo made landfall on Bermuda, L.F. Wade International Airport recorded sustained winds of 93 mph (150 km/h) and gusts up to 113 mph (182 km/h); an elevated observing station at St. Davids reported a peak gust of 144 mph (232 km/h). At the height of the storm about 86% of electricity customers on the island lost power. Multiple buildings suffered roof damage, and downed trees and power lines prevented travel across the island. On Bermuda alone, the storm left at least $200 million in damage. After transitioning into an extratropical cyclone, Gonzalo delivered strong winds to Newfoundland, with gusts peaking at 66 mph (106 km/h) at Cape Pine. Approximately 100 households lost power, while heavy rain caused localized urban flooding in St. Johns.

Extratropical Gonzalo was absorbed by a cold front several hundred nautical miles south-southwest of Iceland on October 20. The storm complex incorporating Gonzalo's remnants generated heavy rain and wind gusts between 50–70 mph (80–113 km/h) in Ireland and the United Kingdom; trees were downed, transportation was disrupted, and one fatality was reported. The storm also produced widespread heavy snow across Germany, France, Switzerland, and Austria. The system later contributed to torrential rains over the Balkans, which resulted in severe flooding in Greece and Bulgaria.

=== Tropical Storm Hanna ===
- Tropical storm (SSHWS)
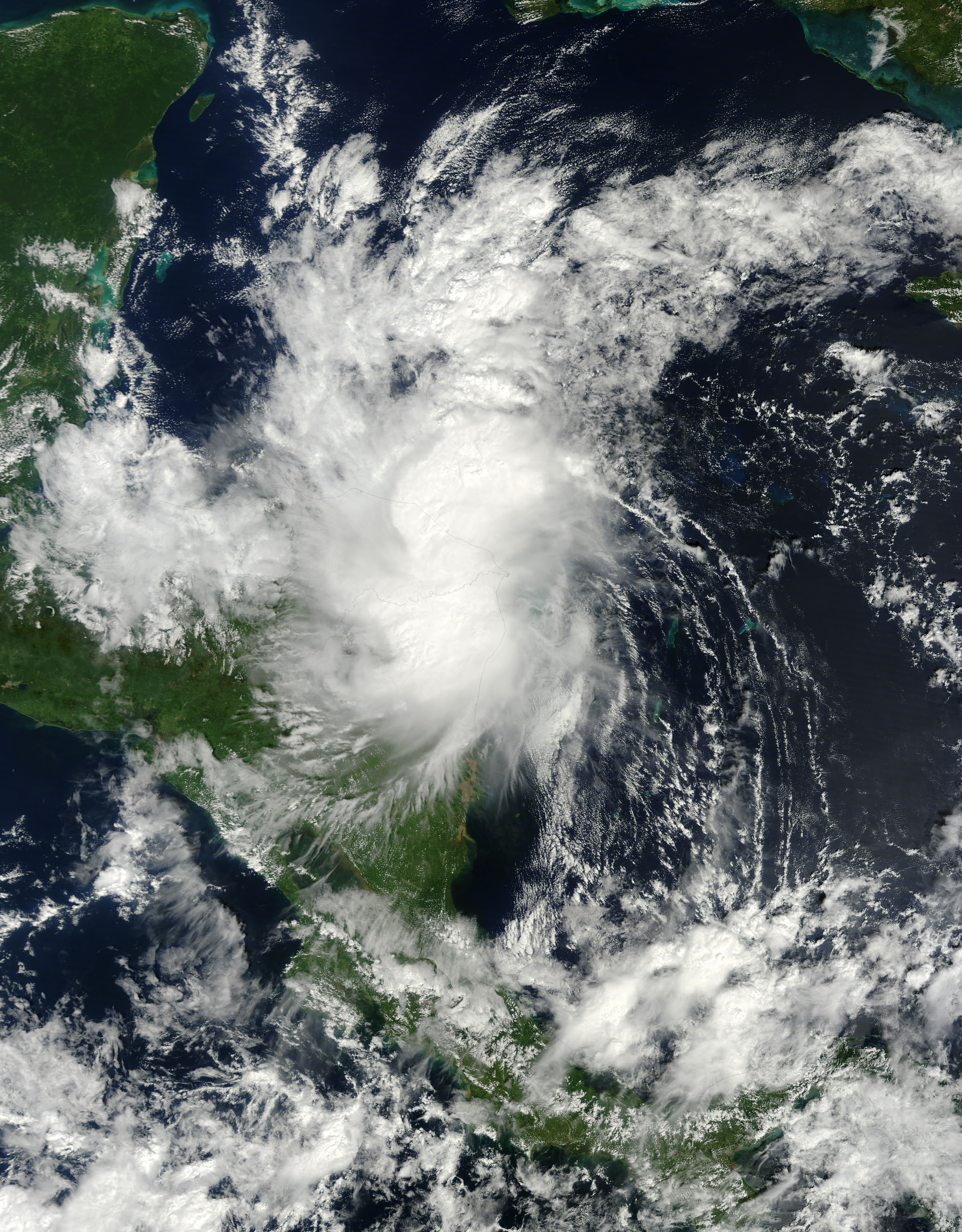
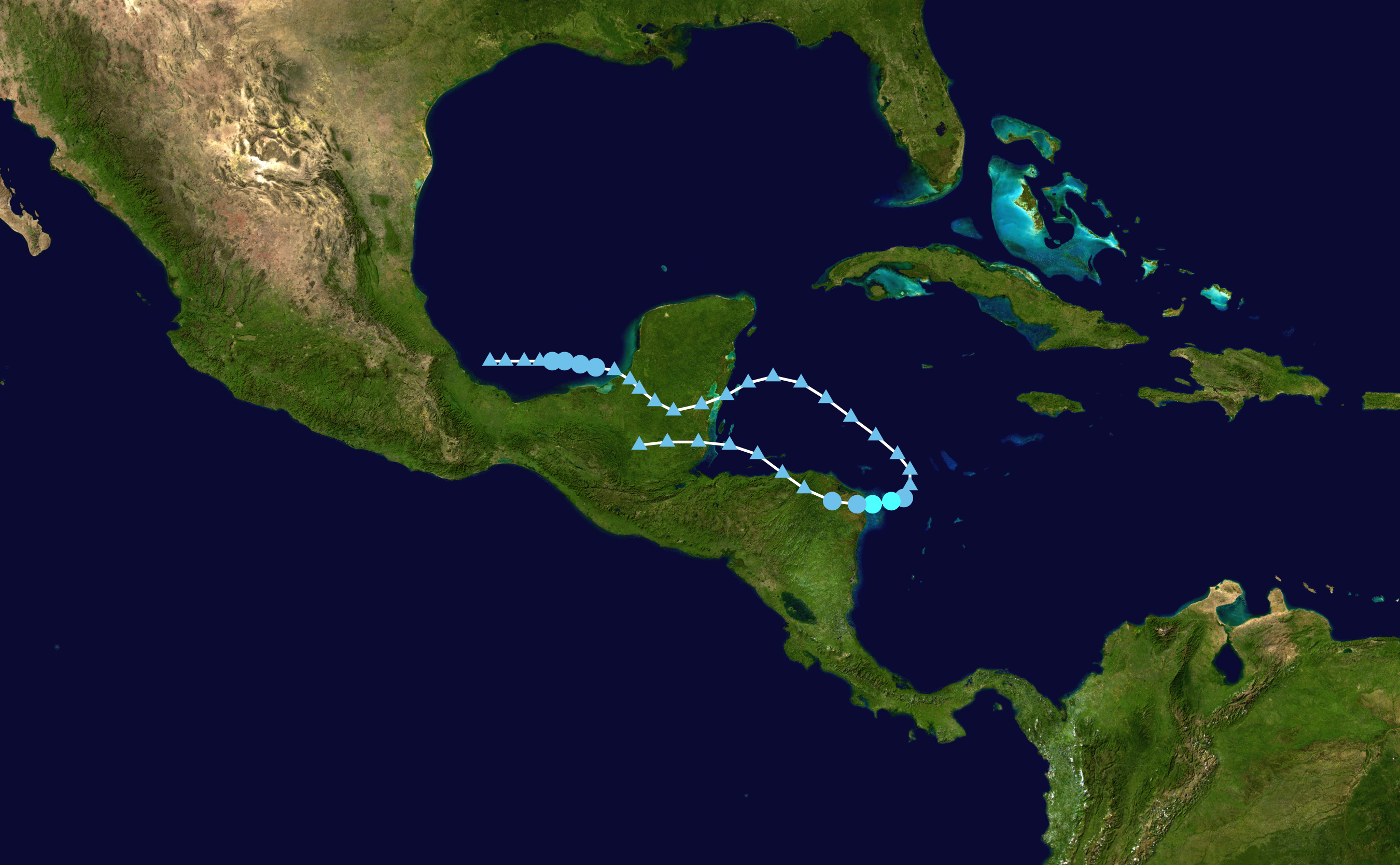
- Duration: October 22 – October 28
- Peak intensity: 40 mph (65 km/h) (1-min); 1000 mbar (hPa)

On October 19, the remnants of Tropical Storm Trudy from the Eastern Pacific basin emerged over the Bay of Campeche, after losing its low-level circulation over the mountainous terrain of Mexico. Moving slowly eastward, the system redeveloped a new surface circulation on October 21, becoming a tropical depression on the next day about 175 mi (280 km) west of Campeche, Mexico. A reconnaissance aircraft flight measured a central pressure of 1000 mbar (hPa; 29.53 inHg) upon its formation, the lowest in relation to the depression. Increasing wind shear and dry air intrusion soon caused the depression to degrade into a remnant low early on October 23 before moving inland over the southwestern Yucatán Peninsula. After crossing the southern Yucatán and northern Belize, the low emerged over the northwestern Caribbean Sea on October 24. Hostile conditions from a nearby frontal boundary ultimately caused the system to degrade into a trough and become entangled within the front.

Subsequent weakening of the frontal system on October 26 allowed the depression's remnants to become better defined as they moved southeast and later southward. The system regained a closed circulation by 12:00 UTC that day as it began turning west. Following the development of deep convection, the system regenerated into a tropical depression around 00:00 UTC on October 27 roughly 80 mi (130 km) east of the Nicaragua–Honduras border. ASCAT scatterometer data shortly thereafter resulted in the depression being upgraded to Tropical Storm Hanna at 06:00 UTC. Just ten hours later Hanna made landfall over extreme northeastern Nicaragua and quickly weakened back to a depression. The system degraded to a remnant low early on October 28 before turning northwestward and emerging over the Gulf of Honduras. Some signs of redevelopment appeared throughout the day, but the remnants of Hanna soon moved inland over Belize early on October 29. The system finally dissipated over northwest Guatemala on the following day. Hanna and its remnants contributed to an ongoing flood in Nicaragua that was responsible for 28 fatalities, many cattle deaths, and a significant loss of grain.

== Storm names ==
The following list of names was used for named storms that formed in the North Atlantic in 2014. This was the same list used in the 2008 season, with the exceptions of Gonzalo, Isaias, and Paulette, which replaced Gustav, Ike, and Paloma, respectively. The name Gonzalo was the only name used for the first time this year. There were no names retired following the 2014 season, so the same list was used again for the 2020 season. The next season to not feature a retired name would not come until 2023.

- Arthur
- Bertha
- Cristobal
- Dolly
- Edouard
- Fay
- Gonzalo
- Hanna
- Isaias (unused)
- Josephine (unused)
- Kyle (unused)
- Laura (unused)
- Marco (unused)
- Nana (unused)
- Omar (unused)
- Paulette (unused)
- Rene (unused)
- Sally (unused)
- Teddy (unused)
- Vicky (unused)
- Wilfred (unused)

== Season effects ==
This is a table of all of the storms that formed in the 2014 Atlantic hurricane season. It includes their name, duration, peak classification and intensities, areas affected, damage, and death totals. Deaths in parentheses are additional and indirect (an example of an indirect death would be a traffic accident), but were still related to that storm. Damage and deaths include totals while the storm was extratropical, a wave, or a low, and all of the damage figures are in 2014 USD.

Saffir–Simpson scale
TD	TS	C1	C2	C3	C4	C5

2014 North Atlantic tropical cyclone season statistics
Storm name	Dates active	Storm category at peak intensity	Max 1-min wind mph (km/h)	Min. press. (mbar)	Areas affected	Damage (US$)	Deaths	Ref(s).
Arthur	July 1–5	Category 2 hurricane	100 (155)	973	The Bahamas, East Coast of the United States, Atlantic Canada	$39.5 million	2	
Two	July 21–23	Tropical depression	35 (55)	1012	None	None	None	
Bertha	August 1–16	Category 1 hurricane	80 (130)	998	Lesser Antilles, Puerto Rico, Hispaniola, Cuba, Lucayan Archipelago, East Coast of the United States, Western Europe	Minimal	4	
Cristobal	August 23–29	Category 1 hurricane	85 (140)	965	Puerto Rico, Hispaniola, Turks and Caicos Islands, Bermuda, East Coast of the United States, Iceland	Unknown	7	
Dolly	September 1–3	Tropical storm	50 (85)	1000	Mexico, Texas	$22.2 million	1	
Edouard	September 11–19	Category 3 hurricane	120 (195)	955	East Coast of the United States	Minimal	2	
Fay	October 10–13	Category 1 hurricane	80 (130)	983	Bermuda	≥ $3.8 million	None	
Gonzalo	October 12–19	Category 4 hurricane	145 (230)	940	Lesser Antilles, Puerto Rico, Bermuda, Newfoundland, Europe	≥ $317 million	6	
Hanna	October 22–28	Tropical storm	40 (65)	1000	Southeastern Mexico, Central America	Unknown	None	
Season aggregates
9 systems	July 1 – October 28		145 (230)	940		≥ $382.5 million	17 (4)	

== See also ==
- Tropical cyclones in 2014
- Weather of 2014
- 2014 Pacific hurricane season
- 2014 Pacific typhoon season
- 2014 North Indian Ocean cyclone season
- South-West Indian Ocean cyclone seasons: 2013–14, 2014–15
- Australian region cyclone seasons: 2013–14, 2014–15
- South Pacific cyclone seasons: 2013–14, 2014–15
- South Atlantic tropical cyclone
- Mediterranean tropical-like cyclone
