= Pagosa Springs High School =

Location
- 800 South Eighth Street; Pagosa Springs, Colorado 81147; United States
- Coordinates: 37°15′21″N 107°1′1″W

Information
- School type: Public high school
- School district: Archuleta 50JT
- CEEB code: 061135
- NCES School ID: 080219000039
- Principal: Sean O'Donnell
- Teaching staff: 30.94
- Grades: 9–12
- Enrollment: 450 (2023-2024)
- Student to teacher ratio: 14.54
- Colors: Black and gold
- Athletics conference: CHSAA
- Mascot: Pirate
- Feeder schools: Pagosa Springs Middle School
- Website: high.mypagosaschools.com

Pagosa Springs High School is a public high school located in Pagosa Springs, Colorado, United States. It is a part of Archuleta County School District 50-JT.

The district includes most of Archuleta County. A portion is in Hinsdale County, where it serves Piedra.

== History ==
Pagosa Springs High School moved into their current building in 1998.

== Athletics ==
=== Teams ===
Pagosa Spring's athletic teams are nicknamed the Pirates and the school's colors are black, white, and gold. Pagosa Springs teams compete in the following sports:

- Baseball
- Boys' basketball
- Boys' golf
- Boys' soccer
- Cross country
- Football
- Girls' basketball
- Girls' soccer
- Swimming
- Track
- Volleyball
- Boys' Wrestling
- Girls' Wrestling

=== State championships ===
- Boys basketball
  - 1960 Colorado Class B State Champions
  - 2013 Colorado Class 3A State Champions
- Girls basketball
  - 2015 Colorado Class 3A State Champions

== Demographics ==
69% of the student population at Pagosa Springs High School identify as Caucasian, 15% identify as Hispanic, 12% identify as American Indian/Alaskan Native, 2% identity as Asian, 1% identify as multiracial, 0.5% identify as African American, and 0.2% identify as Hawaiian Native/Pacific Islander. The student body makeup is 51% male and 49% female.

In 2018 some families dissatisfied with the schools of Dulce Independent Schools in Dulce, New Mexico enrolled their children in Archuleta school district schools. 31 students were going to Pagosa Springs High from the Dulce area. Linda Reed, the superintendent, stated "people have been doing that for years."
