= Dulce Independent Schools =

School district in New Mexico, United States

Dulce Independent Schools (School District 21) is a school district headquartered in Dulce, New Mexico.

It is on the property of the Jicarilla Apache Reservation. The district serves Dulce and Lumberton.

== History ==
In the halfway point 2019–2020 school year the district issued a report. Kyle Land of the Rio Grande Sun stated that the report included information about "High rates of absences, rock-bottom performance scores and a large number of students attending school elsewhere".

Jim Hattabaugh of Fayetteville, Arkansas, became the superintendent in 2020.

== Student body ==
One factor that affects studying times is students accompanying parents on shopping trips, as retail outlets are long distances from the reservation.

In 2018 some families dissatisfied with the schools enrolled their children in Archuleta School District schools in Pagosa Springs, Colorado. That year, there were about 100 such students.

== Operations ==
In 2018 Amanda Martinez of the Rio Grande Sun stated that each day incidents of bullying are reported.

The tribe does not allow non-members to own property in the tribal areas. This factor, along with distances from other settlements and cultural differences, hamper the district's efforts in keeping teachers employed there, according to reports made circa 2018.

== Schools and facilities ==
- Dulce High School
- Dulce Middle School
- Dulce Elementary School
  - In January 2018 the last six rankings from New Mexico educational authorities were "F". The state planned to take direct operation of the school. In response the state and the district devised a "Most Rigorous Intervention", with the state asking the school district to rework earlier revisions. After it was finalized, the district was not allowed to change it. In August 2018 the New Mexico Public Education Department sent a notification that the school district was not abiding by the plan. The state had proposed the "$100,000 Teacher" program, spending money for teacher retention, and wanted Dulce Elementary to be a part of the program. The district opposed this. The New Mexico Legislature Legislative Education Study Committee stated that it was questioning whether the education department had the right to subject the school district to the conditions.

The district also maintains residences for its employees.
