= Archuleta School District =

School district headquartered in Pagosa Springs, Colorado

Address
- 800 B South 8th Street Pagosa Springs, Archuleta County, Colorado; United States

District information
- Grades: K–12
- Superintendent: Richard M. Holt
- Schools: 5
- District ID: 0802190

Students and staff
- Students: 1,604
- Teachers: 110.54 FTE
- Student–teacher ratio: 14.51:1

Other information
- Website: www.mypagosaschools.com

Archuleta County School District 50-JT is a school district headquartered in Pagosa Springs, Colorado.

The district includes most of Archuleta County. A portion is in Hinsdale County, where it serves Piedra.

== History ==
Archuleta School District 50 JT was consolidated in 1950 from numerous small school districts throughout Archuleta County.

Linda Reed became the superintendent circa 2013

In 2018, some families dissatisfied with the schools of Dulce Independent Schools in Dulce, New Mexico, enrolled their children in Archuleta school district schools. There were 99 such students, with 32, 36, and 31 in elementary, middle, and high school levels, respectively. Reed stated, "people have been doing that for years."

Richard M. Holt became the superintendent in 2022.

== Schools ==
- Pagosa Springs High School (Grade 9 – Grade 12)
- Pagosa Middle School (Grade 5 – Grade 8)
- Pagosa Elementary School (Kindergarten – Grade 4)
- Pagosa Family School (provides electives to homeschool and private school students)
- San Juan Mountain School (alternative high school, Grade 9 – Grade 12)

Previously the district had separate intermediate school (grades 5–6) and junior high school divisions.

In 2017, the district signed a contract with Pagosa Peak Open School, an independent non-profit corporation, to operate a K–8 charter school in the Aspen Village subdivision. As of the 2022–2023 school year, PPOS had an enrollment of about 125 students. The school is tuition-free and open to all Archuleta County families.
