= Piedra, Colorado =

Census-designated place in Hinsdale County, CO, USA

- Census-designated place
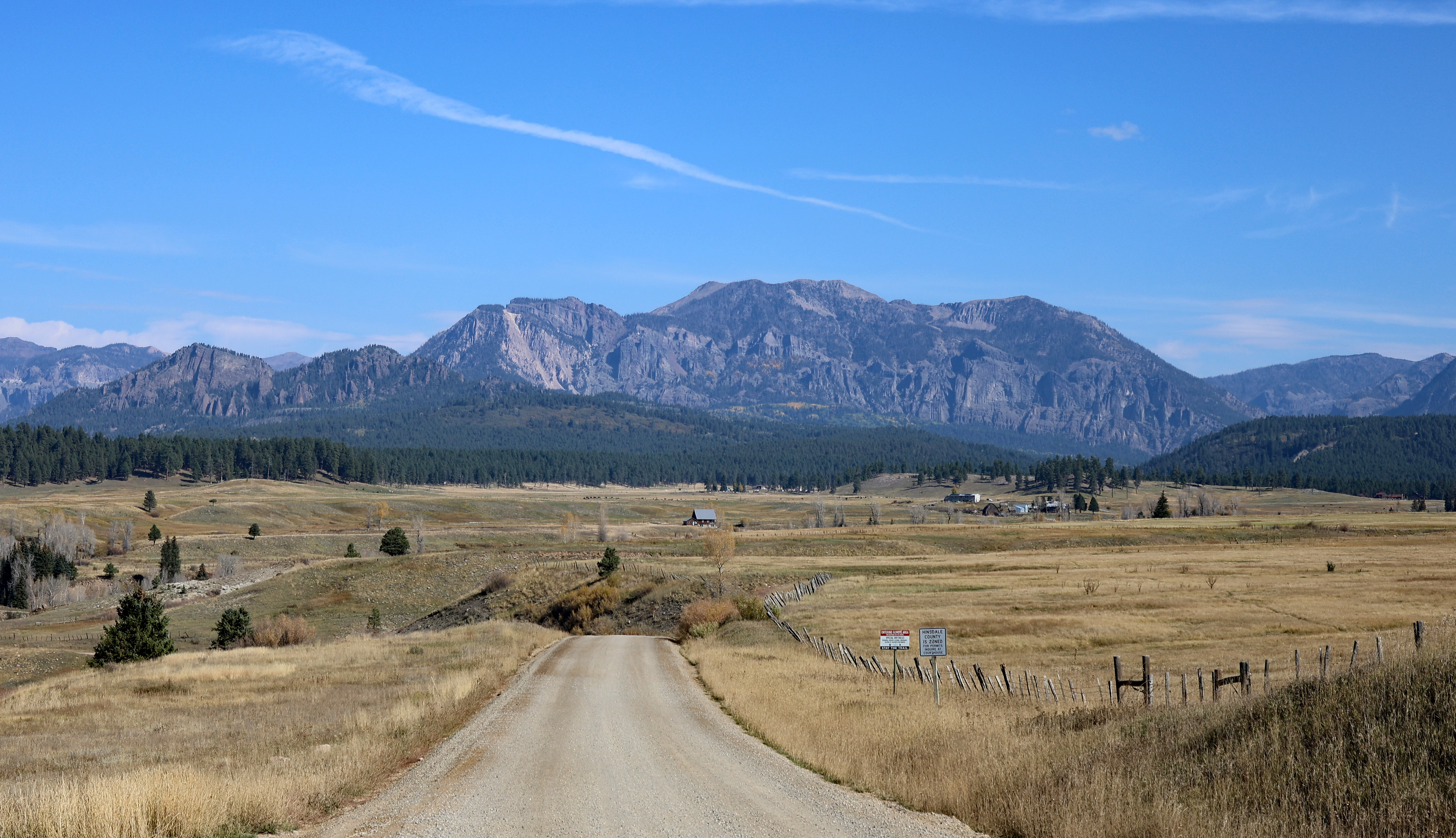
- Piedra in 2024

- Location of the Piedra CDP in Hinsdale County, Colorado
- Coordinates: 37°26′30″N 107°10′06″W
- Country: United States
- State: Colorado
- County: Hinsdale

Government
  - Type: Unincorporated community

Area
  - Total: 11.621 sq mi (30.098 km^{2})
  - Land: 11.621 sq mi (30.098 km^{2})
  - Water: 0 sq mi (0.000 km^{2})
- Elevation: 7,874 ft (2,400 m)

Population (2020)
  - Total: 31
  - Density: 2.7/sq mi (1.03/km^{2})
- Time zone: UTC-7 (MST)
  - Summer (DST): UTC-6 (MDT)
- ZIP Code: Pagosa Springs 81147
- Area code: 970
- GNIS feature ID: 2583280

Piedra is an unincorporated community and a census-designated place (CDP) located in and governed by Hinsdale County, Colorado, United States. The population of the Piedra CDP was 31 at the United States Census 2020. The Pagosa Springs post office (Zip Code 81147) serves the area.

== History ==
The Piedra Post Office was established in 1879, and remained in operation until 1927. Piedra is a name derived from Spanish meaning "stone".

== Geography ==
The Piedra CDP occupies the southeast corner of Hinsdale County in the valley of the Piedra River within San Juan National Forest. It is at the southern edge of the San Juan Mountains. The CDP is 18 miles (29 km) west of Pagosa Springs.

The Piedra CDP has an area of 7,437 acres (30.098 km^{2}), all land.

== Demographics ==
Piedra CDP, Colorado
Year	Pop.	±%
2010	28	—
2020	31	+10.7%
Source: United States Census Bureau

The United States Census Bureau initially defined the Piedra CDP for the United States Census 2010.

== Education ==
Archuleta County School District 50-JT operates public schools. Pagosa Springs High School is the comprehensive high school.

== See also ==
- Hinsdale County, Colorado
