= 2026 Pagosa Springs flood =

2026 flood in Archuleta County, Colorado

2026 Pagosa Springs flood chart, NOAA

The town of Pagosa Springs, Colorado began flooding on October 21, 2026 and continued until October 25th, due to heavy rainfall and an atmospheric river caused by a strong El Niño climate system as well as the remains of Hurricane Trudy.

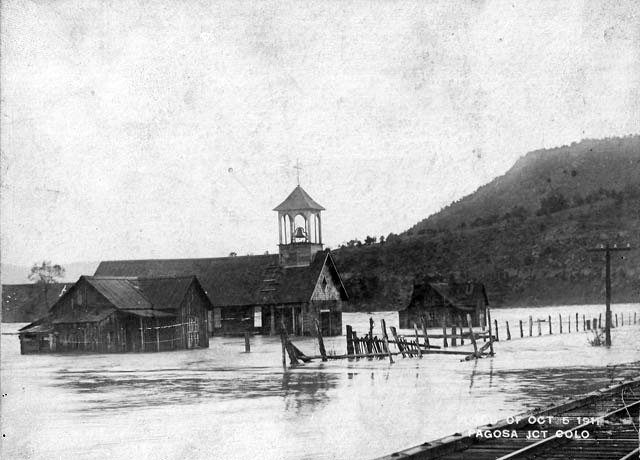
1911 flood, Pagosa Junction, Pagosa Springs, Colorado

The San Juan River to peaked at 15 feet; the highest level of the river in over 100 years, and the worst flood since the 1911 when the river peaked above 17 feet. Normally the level of the river is 4 feet. Over 540 homes were damaged, and 25% of all roads were rendered impassable due to the flood; many roads were heavily damaged. Numerous hot springs were flooded, an important source of income for the town as well as serving tourists and locals.

A disaster emergency was called due to damage to the public infrastructure, including bridges and culverts in addition to the roads and structures. The town of Pagosa Springs organized the recovery and clean up efforts. Mandatory evacuation orders were given along the San Juan River.

Due to an atmospheric river surge on November 1 another severe storm moved into the area causing additional flooding and mandatory evacuations. According to NOAA's observed measurements, the river crested at 16.81 feet (5.12 m) at 9:45 pm on November 2, higher than the first wave of the flood, but not exceeding the 1911 flood which peaked at 17.8 feet.

The town of Pagosa Springs issued a warning that raw sewage was discharging directly into the river floodwater. Towns people were warned that it was hazardous to come into contact with the water. A shelter-in-place order was issued. Many of the hot springs soaking pools and lower terraces at The Springs resort were flooded with river water containing sewage.

A significant portion of the foundation of the Pagosa Springs History Museum was washed away by November 2nd, leaving half of the building teetering over the surging river, and forcing closure of Colorado highway 160 endangering the bridge into town.
