= Mary Winter Fisher =

American physician (1867–1928)

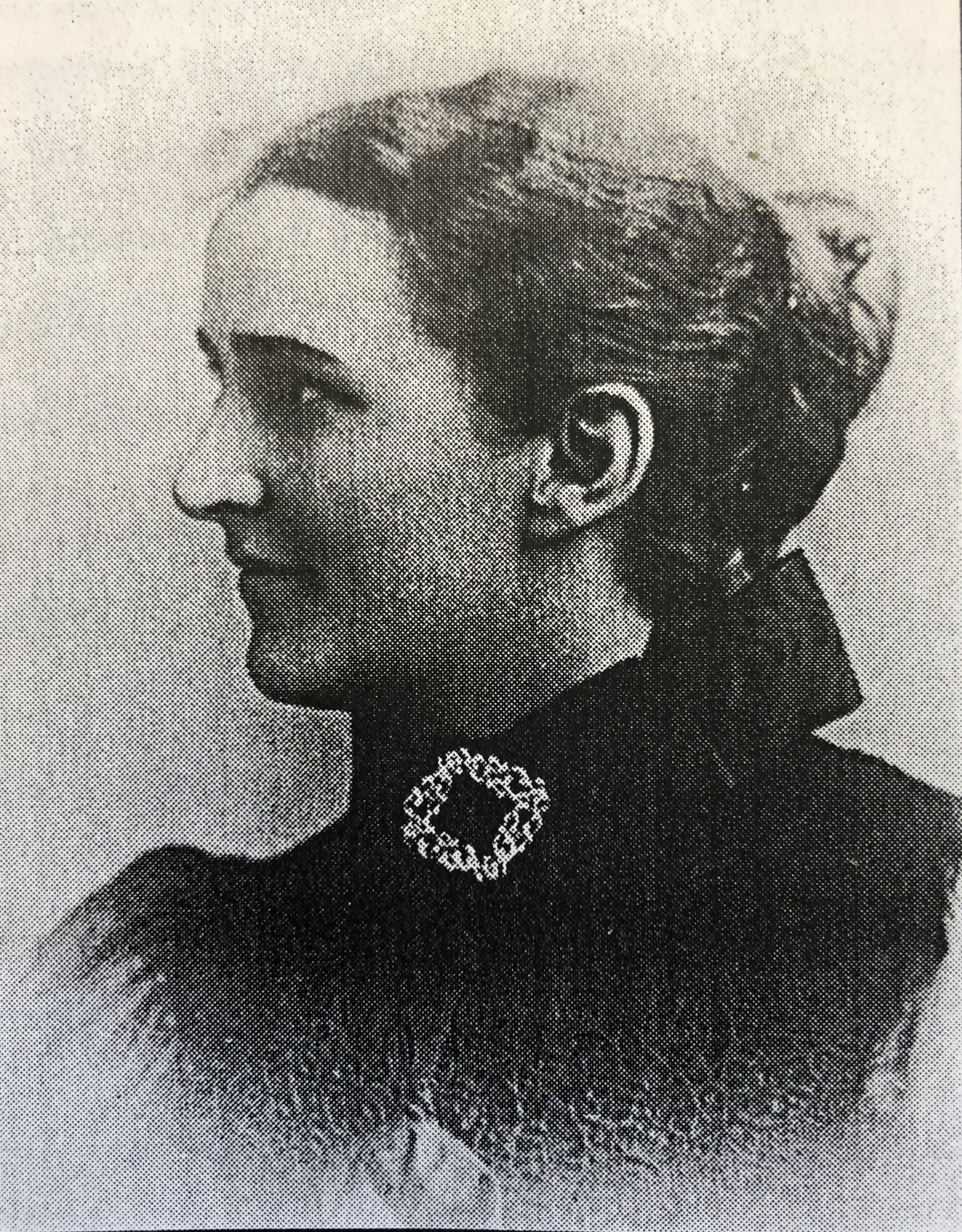
- Dr. Mary Winter Fisher, c. late 19th century
- Born: Mary Winter; February 10, 1867; Lewiston, Illinois
- Died: May 30, 1928 (aged 61); Pagosa Springs, Colorado
- Occupations: physician, surgeon
- Years active: 1895–1928

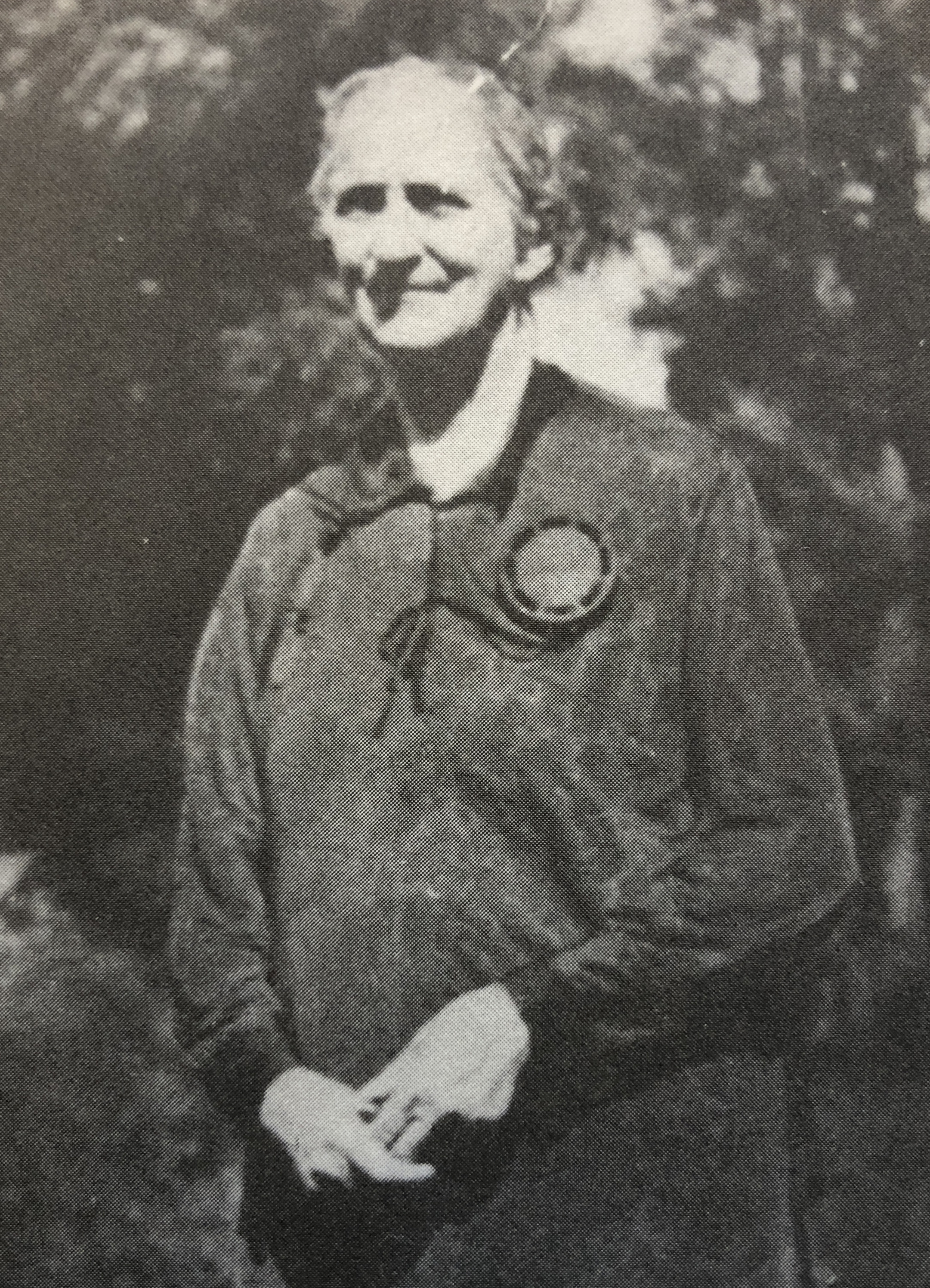
Dr. Mary Winter Fisher in 1926

Mary Winter Fisher (1867–1928) was an American physician known for her establishment of a medical practice in Pagosa Springs, Colorado.

== Early life and education ==
Fisher was born on February 10, 1867, in Lewiston, Illinois, to John S. Winter, a journalist who later became a judge, and Mary Winter. Her mother died six months after her birth.

She pursued medical studies in Chicago; initially attending classes at Rush University, and later completing her education at the Hahnemann Medical College of Chicago, where she earned a Doctor of Homeopathy and Surgery degree in 1895.

== Career ==
Following medical school, Fisher began practicing in Lewiston, Illinois. In 1895 she moved to the San Juan Mountains of Southern Colorado as a single, 28-year old woman. She first settled in La Jara, Colorado, where she taught for a term in a public school that had been founded by her sister. She then moved to the small town of Pagosa Springs, between Durango, Colorado, and Chama, New Mexico. She opened a medical office in Pagosa Springs the same year. The town had several bathhouses fed by local hot springs that were established in the 1860s. The mineral waters were used for their balneotheraputic properties by local miners as well as by injured Civil War soldiers.

Fisher became known locally as Dr. Mary. She developed a reputation throughout the state for her diagnostic abilities, and skillful treatments.

In 1911 she worked as the coroner for Archuleta County, and also served as the county's officer of health. She also worked as the Archuleta County registrar of vital statistics.

Fisher practiced in Pagosa Springs for 33 years, and had a state-wide reputation and beyond, having been known to the Mayo Brothers hospital in Rochester, Minnesota.

== Personal life ==
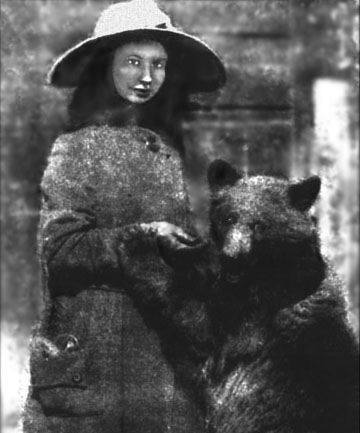
Dr. Mary Winter Fisher, 1880s, with her pet bear, Pickles

Fisher admired wildlife, and had a pet wolf, and a pet bear named Pickles.

In December 1902 she married J.P. Fisher, a pharmacist.

== Death and legacy ==
Later in life, Fisher diagnosed with breast cancer and eventually succumbed to the disease at the age of 61 on May 30, 1928.

She is honored in several ways in Pagosa Springs Medical Center is named after her, as is the Dr. Mary Fisher Medical Foundation, and the Dr. Mary Fisher Park in Pagosa Springs.

Her former residence at 138 Pagosa Street where she first operated her medical practice, has been designated a historic landmark.

She was survived by her brother, William Scripps Winter, her sister Lizzie Thomas and a nephew, Thornton Thomas. She was related to the Scripps family of San Diego, California, including Edward W. Scripps, a newspaper publisher, Ellen Browning Scripps, a journalist and philanthropist, James E. Scripps, a journalist, Samuel H. Scripps, a philanthropist of dance and theater.
