= Tropical Storm Trudy (2014) =

Pacific tropical storm in 2014

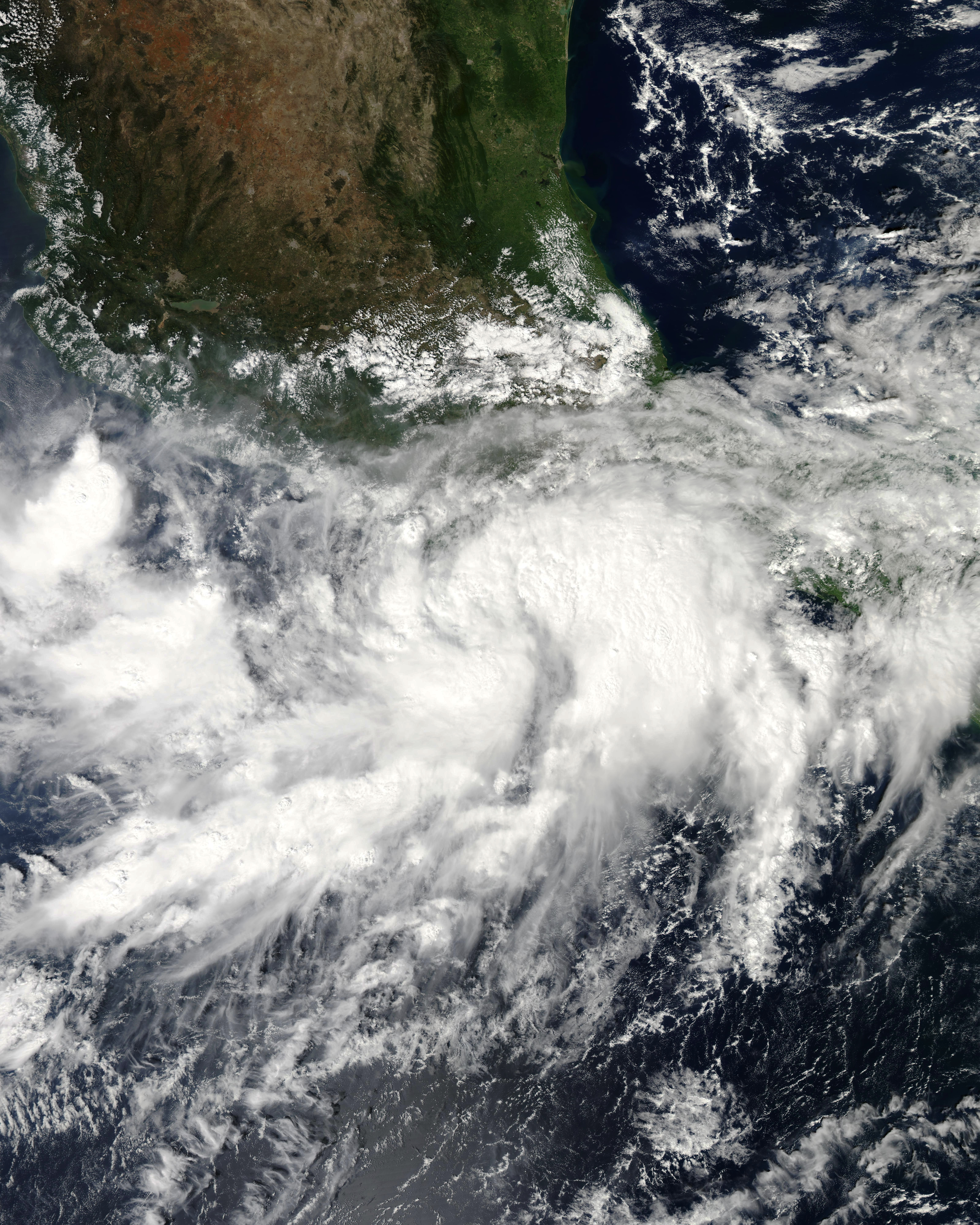
- Tropical Storm Trudy shortly after being named on October 17

Meteorological history
- Formed: October 17, 2014
- Dissipated: October 19, 2014

Tropical storm
- 1-minute sustained (SSHWS/NWS)
- Highest winds: 65 mph (100 km/h)
- Lowest pressure: 998 mbar (hPa); 29.47 inHg

Overall effects
- Fatalities: 9 total
- Damage: $7.91 million (2014 USD)
- Areas affected: Southern Mexico
- IBTrACS
- Part of the 2014 Pacific hurricane season

Tropical Storm Trudy was a short-lived tropical cyclone in October 2014 that caused significant flooding in southern Mexico. The storm originated from an area of low pressure associated with a monsoon trough near Central America in early October. A slow-moving system, the low eventually consolidated into a tropical depression on October 17 near the Mexican coastline. Favorable environmental conditions aided rapid development of Trudy. Within 15 hours of its designation, an eye formed over the storm's center. Trudy ultimately achieved its peak intensity as a strong tropical storm with 65 mph (100 km/h) winds as it made landfall just southeast of Marquelia, Mexico. The region's mountainous terrain quickly weakened Trudy and the cyclone dissipated early on October 19. Though the cyclone dissipated, its remnant energy later contributed to the formation of Tropical Storm Hanna in the Atlantic.

Prior to Trudy's landfall, the Government of Mexico issued multiple watches and warnings for the threatened region. Forecasters highlighted the threat of heavy rains and mudslides. Guerrero experienced the greatest effects from Trudy, with landslides and flooding claiming eight lives in the state. Over 4,000 people were evacuated in the region. A ninth fatality took place in Campeche.

== Meteorological history ==
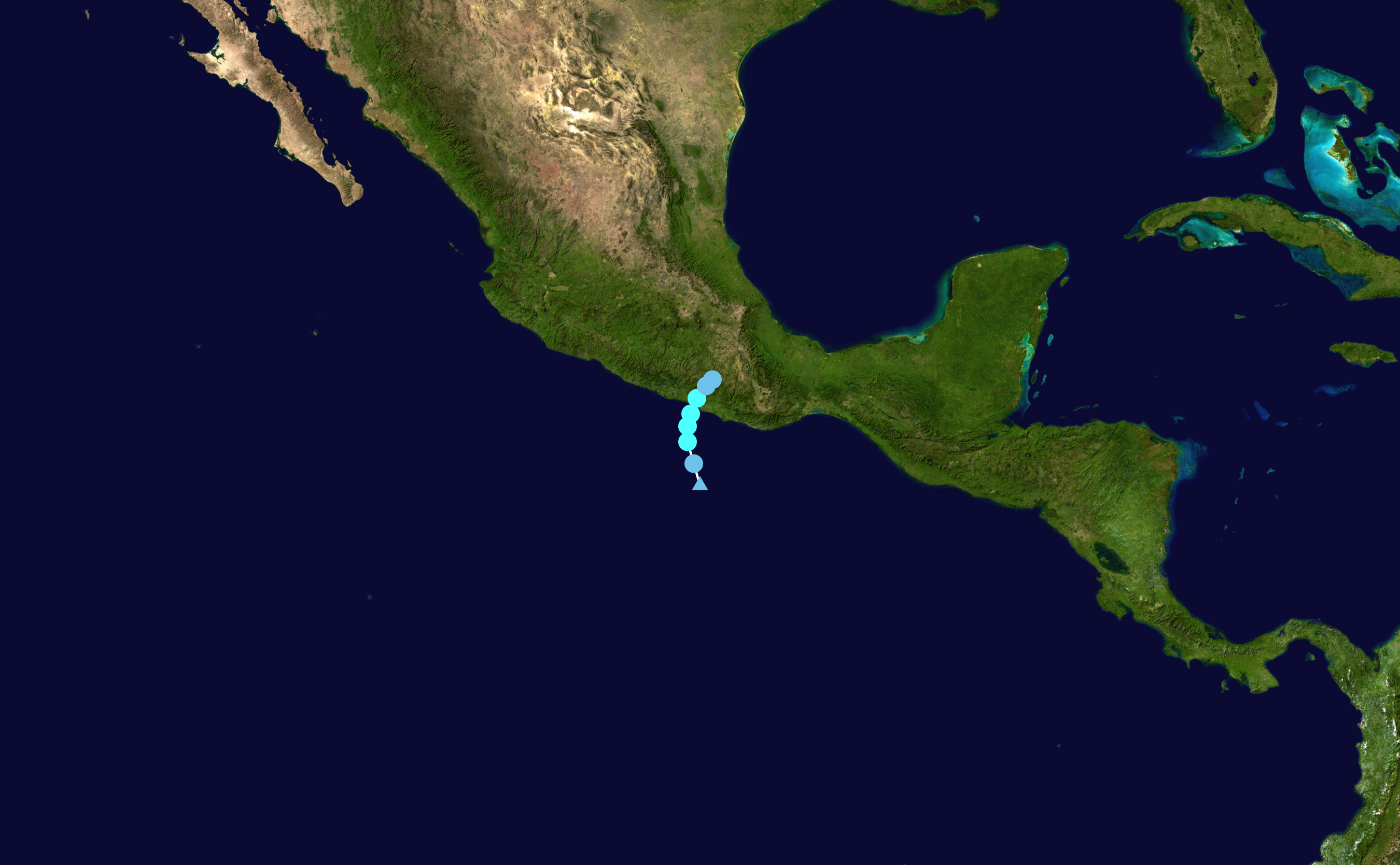
Map plotting the storm's track and intensity, according to the Saffir–Simpson scale Map key Saffir–Simpson scale Tropical depression (≤38 mph, ≤62 km/h) Tropical storm (39–73 mph, 63–118 km/h) Category 1 (74–95 mph, 119–153 km/h) Category 2 (96–110 mph, 154–177 km/h) Category 3 (111–129 mph, 178–208 km/h) Category 4 (130–156 mph, 209–251 km/h) Category 5 (≥157 mph, ≥252 km/h) Unknown Storm type Tropical cyclone Subtropical cyclone Extratropical cyclone, remnant low, tropical disturbance, or monsoon depression

On October 8, a weak area of low pressure developed within a monsoon trough over the extreme eastern edge of the Pacific basin. Environmental conditions ahead of the system were forecast to become gradually favorable for tropical cyclogenesis. Situated near Costa Rica, scattered convection accompanied the well-defined system. This low became less defined over the following days while remaining in the same general area. The National Hurricane Center (NHC) began monitoring the system for long-term cyclogenesis on October 13, at which time the low was situated 150 mi (240 km) south of Guatemala. Organization was prolonged and slow; however, the convergence of a Kelvin wave and a Gulf of Tehuantepec gap wind event on October 15 spurred a significant increase in convection.

Marked structural improvements took place on October 17 and the NHC assessed a high probability of the system becoming a tropical cyclone within 48 hours. That evening, corroborating data from ships, satellite imagery, and scatterometer estimates indicated the formation of a tropical depression by 12:00 UTC. With the cyclone located over warm waters of 86 °F (30 °C) and within a very moist region with low wind shear, intensification was a certainty as the depression approached Mexico. Uncertainties existed as to how fast the system would move. Some forecast models depicting the system as stalling just offshore for several days, though forecasters indicated that a steady northward movement would lead to dissipation within 48 hours.

Owing to the aforementioned environmental conditions, the depression intensified to a tropical storm by 18:00 UTC on October 17; it was subsequently assigned the name Trudy by the NHC. Very deep convection blossomed over both the center and accompanying banding features. During the morning of October 18, a central dense overcast became increasingly defined; microwave satellite imagery and coastal radars depicted the formation of a 12 to 17 mi (19 to 27 km) wide eye by 03:00 UTC. It is estimated that Trudy reached its peak intensity around 09:15 UTC on October 18 with maximum sustained winds of 65 mph (100 km/h) and a barometric pressure of 998 mbar (hPa; 29.47 inHg). Simultaneously the storm made landfall just southeast of Marquelia, or roughly 70 mi (110 km) east of Acapulco. Interaction with the mountainous terrain of Mexico quickly took its toll on Trudy, with the system degrading to a tropical depression by 18:00 UTC. The low-level circulation of the depression dissipated early on October 19, with its mid-level remnants continuing northeastward over Mexico. The remnant system emerged over the Bay of Campeche on October 20 and subsequently developed into Atlantic Tropical Depression Nine—which later became Tropical Storm Hanna—on October 22. Due to the dissipation of its surface low, Trudy and Hanna are considered separate tropical cyclones by the NHC.

== Preparations and impact ==
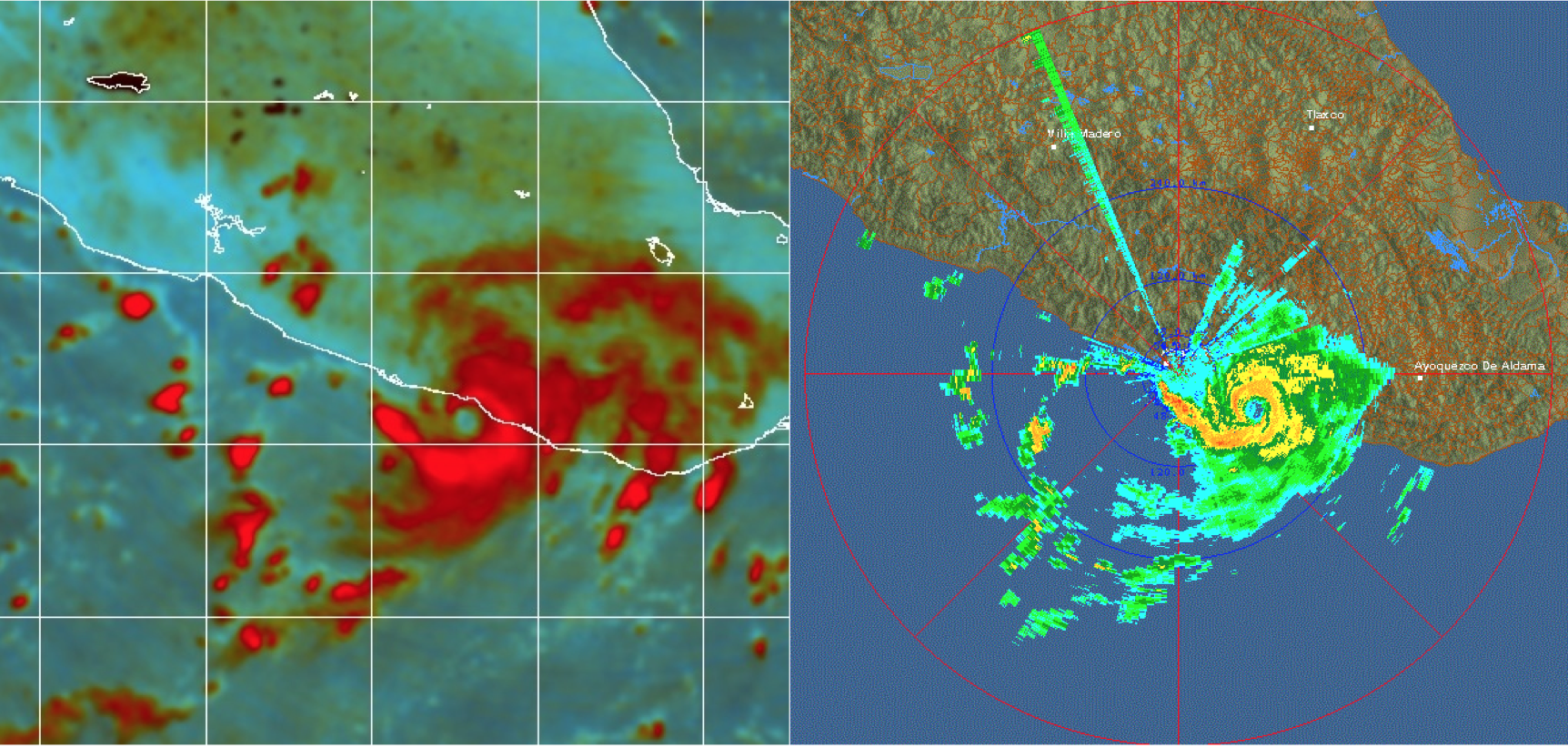
Microwave satellite and radar imagery of Tropical Storm Trudy on October 18 as it made landfall in Mexico, depicting its well-developed inner core and eye.

Upon the designation of Tropical Depression Twenty-E on October 17, a tropical storm warning was issued for coastal areas of Mexico between Tecpán de Galeana and Lagunas de Chacahua. Forecasters at the NHC noted that the greatest threat from the system would be torrential rains across Guerrero and Oaxaca that could trigger life-threatening flash floods and mudslides. Rapid organization of the system prompted a hurricane watch to be issued by 09:00 UTC on October 18 for areas between Acapulco and Lagunas de Chacahua. This watch was soon discontinued as Trudy failed to reach hurricane intensity before moving inland over Mexico. The tropical storm warning was subsequently allowed to expire by 21:00 UTC as Trudy weakened to a depression. In addition to the above watches and warnings, a "yellow" alert was activated for Guerrero on October 17. Upon abruptly intensifying prior to landfall, a "red" alert was activated for southeastern Guerrero and southwestern Oaxaca while the rest of Guerrero and Oaxaca were placed under an "orange" alert. A total of 35 shelters were opened across eastern areas of Guerrero.

Heavy rains across Guerrero wreaked havoc, causing widespread flooding and damage. A total of 4,075 people were evacuated from the most at-risk areas in the state. A further 300 residents were urged to leave as a river threatened to over-top its banks. Wall collapses attributed to the storm resulted in four deaths: three in Ometepec and one in Cochoapa el Grande. A landslide in Tlacoachistlahuaca killed two people. Road access to 16 towns was cut off and the main road to Acapulco was damaged by landslides and flooding. Approximately 5,000 homes were affected by the storm, with 218 damaged by flooding and 6 destroyed. More than 20,000 households lost power due to the storm, though the vast majority was restored within a day.

Oaxaca experienced similar impacts to Guerrero, with flooding and landslides mostly causing damage to road infrastructure. Notably, a 39 ft (12 m) bridge in San Martín Peras collapsed, leaving several villages isolated. At least 160 ft (50 m) of Mexican Federal Highway 125 was washed away, requiring a repair bill of 8 million pesos (US$592,000). An emergency declaration was made for 100 municipalities in Oaxaca. Total damage in the state reached 107 million pesos (US$7.91 million). Trudy was also blamed for one death in Campeche.

== See also ==
- Other storms of the same name
- Hurricane Barbara (2013)
- Tropical Storm Boris (2014)
- Tropical storms Amanda and Cristobal (2020)
