= Lumberton, New Mexico =

- Census-designated place
- Location within New Mexico
- Coordinates: 36°55′58″N 106°56′07″W
- Country: United States
- State: New Mexico
- County: Rio Arriba

Area
  - Total: 0.48 sq mi (1.24 km^{2})
  - Land: 0.48 sq mi (1.24 km^{2})
  - Water: 0 sq mi (0.00 km^{2})
- Elevation: 6,844 ft (2,086 m)

Population (2020)
  - Total: 70
  - Density: 146.3/sq mi (56.49/km^{2})
- Time zone: UTC-7 (Mountain (MST))
  - Summer (DST): UTC-6 (MDT)
- Area code: 575
- GNIS feature ID: 2584148

Lumberton is a census-designated place in Rio Arriba County, New Mexico, United States. As of the 2020 census, Lumberton had a population of 70. U.S. Route 64 passes through the community.

It is zoned to Dulce Independent Schools.

== History ==
The Denver & Rio Grande Railroad constructed its San Juan Extension through the area in 1882. About 1894 a lumberman, E.M. Biggs, bought 40 acres from a ranch owned by Francisco Lobato, and laid out the townsite, naming it for the sawmills which he built there. A post office was established in 1894, which closed on January 28, 1995. Biggs also built extensive logging railroads north and south, the last of which were removed by 1928 when the marketable timber had been exhausted. The D&RG also closed and was removed in 1969.

== Demographics ==
Historical population
Census	Pop.	Note	%±
2020	70		—
U.S. Decennial Census
