= Pagosa hot springs =

Thermal spring

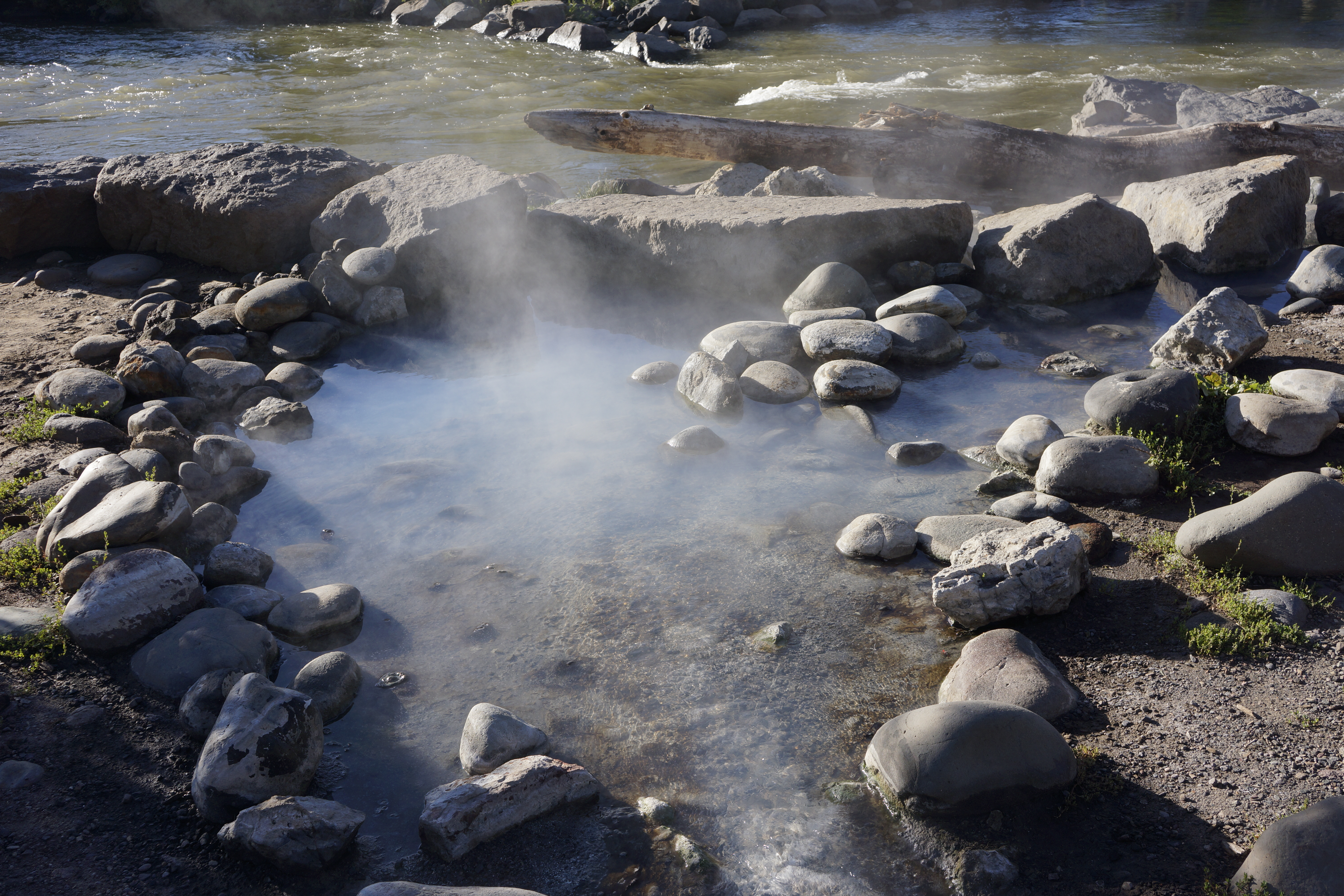

- Location within Colorado
- Location: Southern Colorado
- Coordinates: 37°16′5″N 107°1′28″W
- Elevation: 7,126 ft (2,172 m)
- Type: geothermal spring
- Temperature: 110 °F (43 °C) to 144 °F (62 °C)
- Depth: 1,002 ft (305 m)

Pagosa hot springs (Ute: Pah gosah) is a hot spring system located in the San Juan Basin of Archuleta County, Colorado. The town of Pagosa Springs claim they are the world's deepest known geothermal hot springs.

== History ==
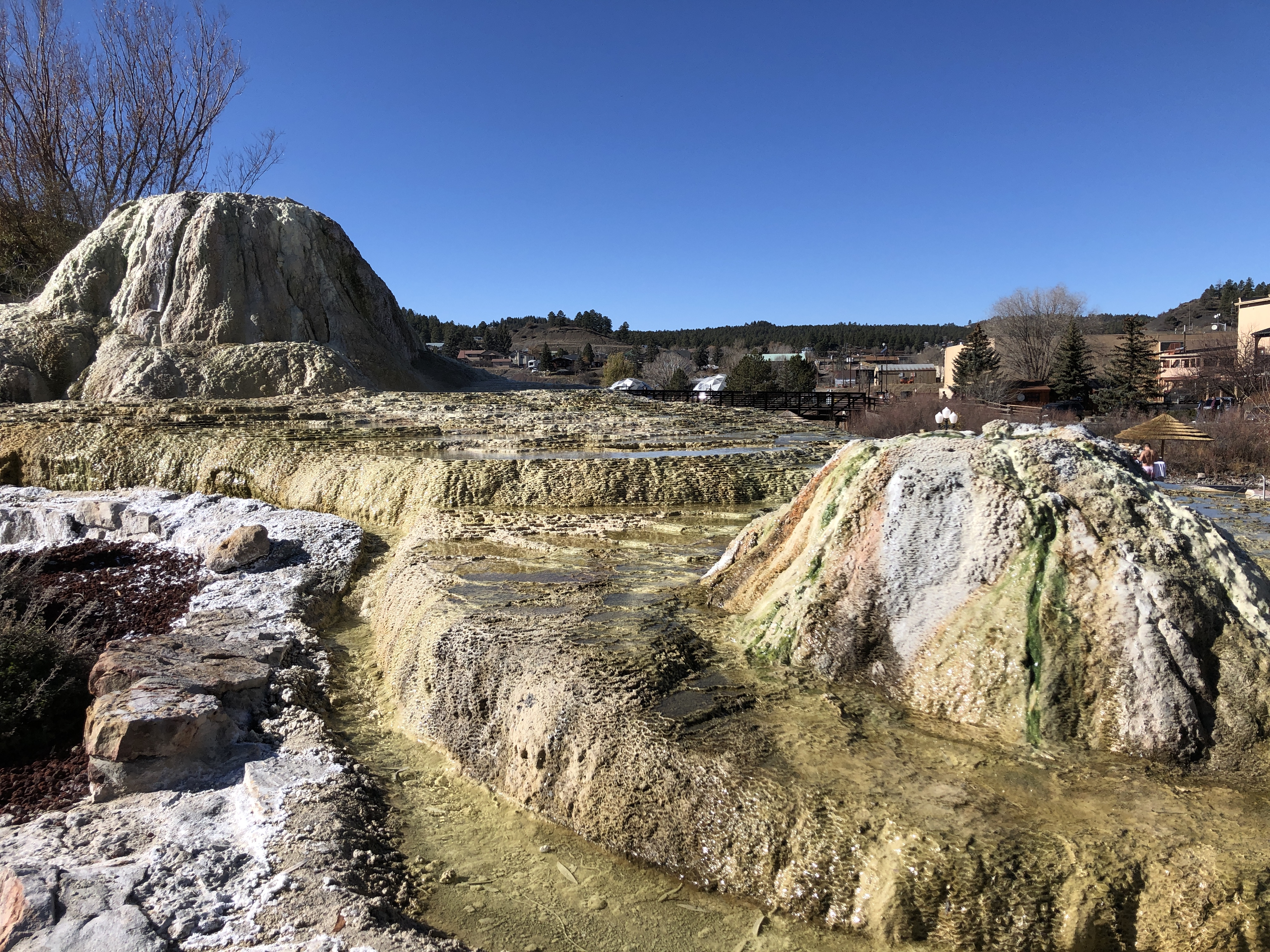
Two of the many hot springs at Pagosa

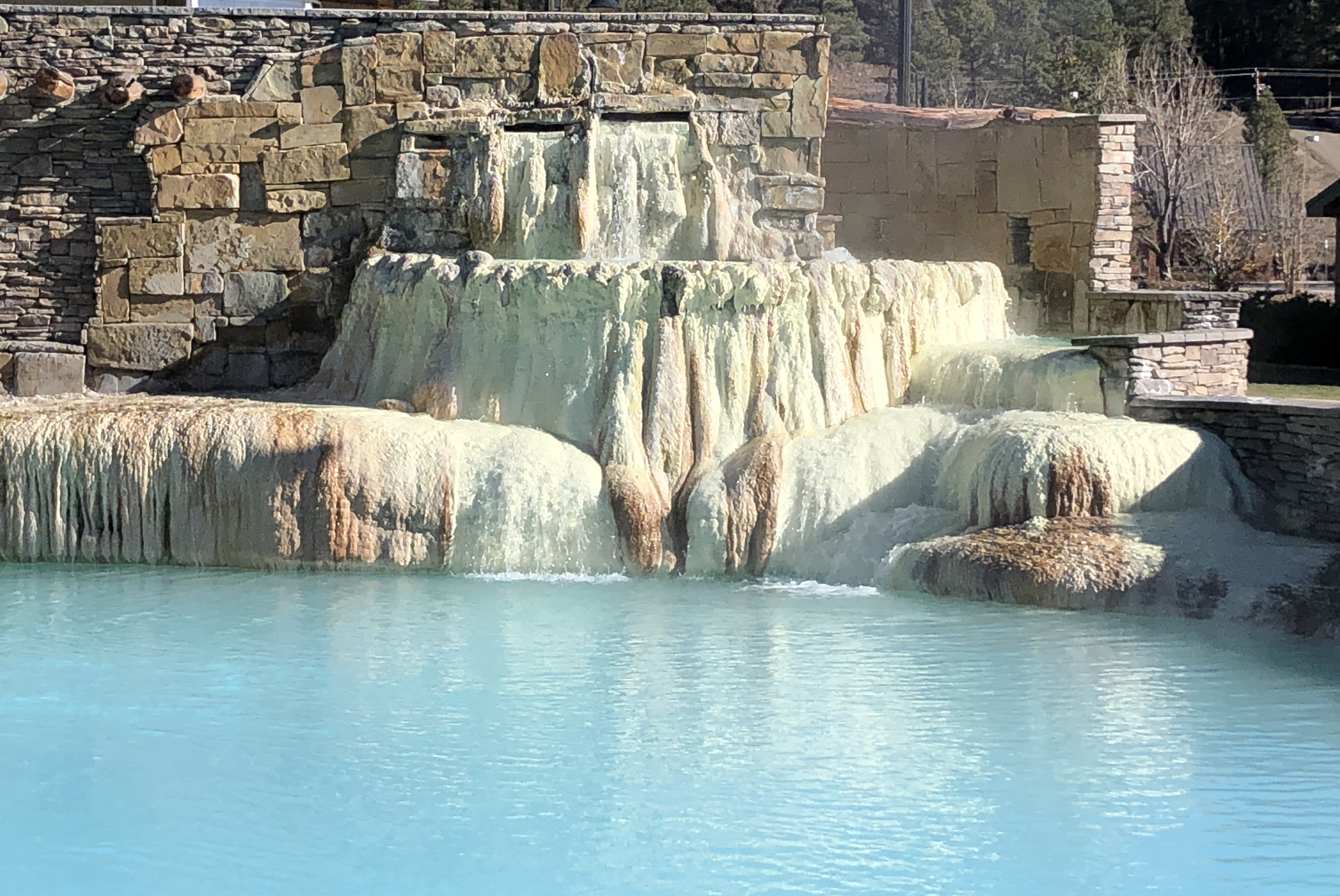
The Mother Spring

Before the arrival of Hispanic and Anglo settlers, the springs were used by the Folsom culture; a 9,000-year-old Folsom point was found at the site of a shelter foundation nearby. Later, the Ancestral Puebloan people used the springs, having settled at the San Juan River approximately 1,000 years ago. Shards of pottery made by the Ancestral Puebloans were found at the springs in the 1950s when a well excavation blast caused the spring water to eject underground material.

The springs were later used by the modern Pueblo people, Ute, Navajo and Apache. The hot springs were used by these indigenous people for centuries, and it has been written that they were considered "sacred ground". In the cosmology of the Navajo people, Pagosa Springs is near the place where the People (Diné) emerged from their Fourth World underground to the present world known as the Fifth World, according to The Dîné: Origin Myths of the Navaho Indians.

The springs are known to the Ute people as Pah gosah which means either "healing water" or "water (pah) that has a bad smell (gosah)", referring to the pungent odor of hydrogen sulphide gas produced by the interaction of sulphur with anaerobic bacteria in the mineral water.

In 1859, the springs were recorded by Captain John Macomb during his exploration expedition of the San Juan area. He noted that the springs were considered a sacred site and a "place of peace" that was used by various tribes. After white settlers arrived, much of the area surrounding the major spring (now known as The Mother Spring) was landfilled and walkways were constructed between springs and vapor vents.

Public and private bathhouses were built for use by gold miners and families, as well as injured Civil War soldiers. In the 1860s the United States Army considered developing the hot springs for their healing properties, and documented the efficacy of the mineral water. Following the Civil War, the U.S. government deliberated on whether or not to build a convalenscent hospital at the thermal mineral springs. The project was never approved, and the lands were sold to private individuals who commercialized and capitalized on the springs. Primitive wooden bathhouses were built along both sides of the San Juan river. A commercial bathhouse was first constructed 1881, for paying customers (including European tourists) who wanted to "take to the waters".

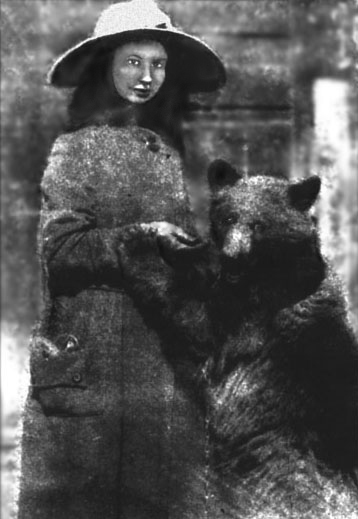
Mary Fisher with her pet bear in the 1880s

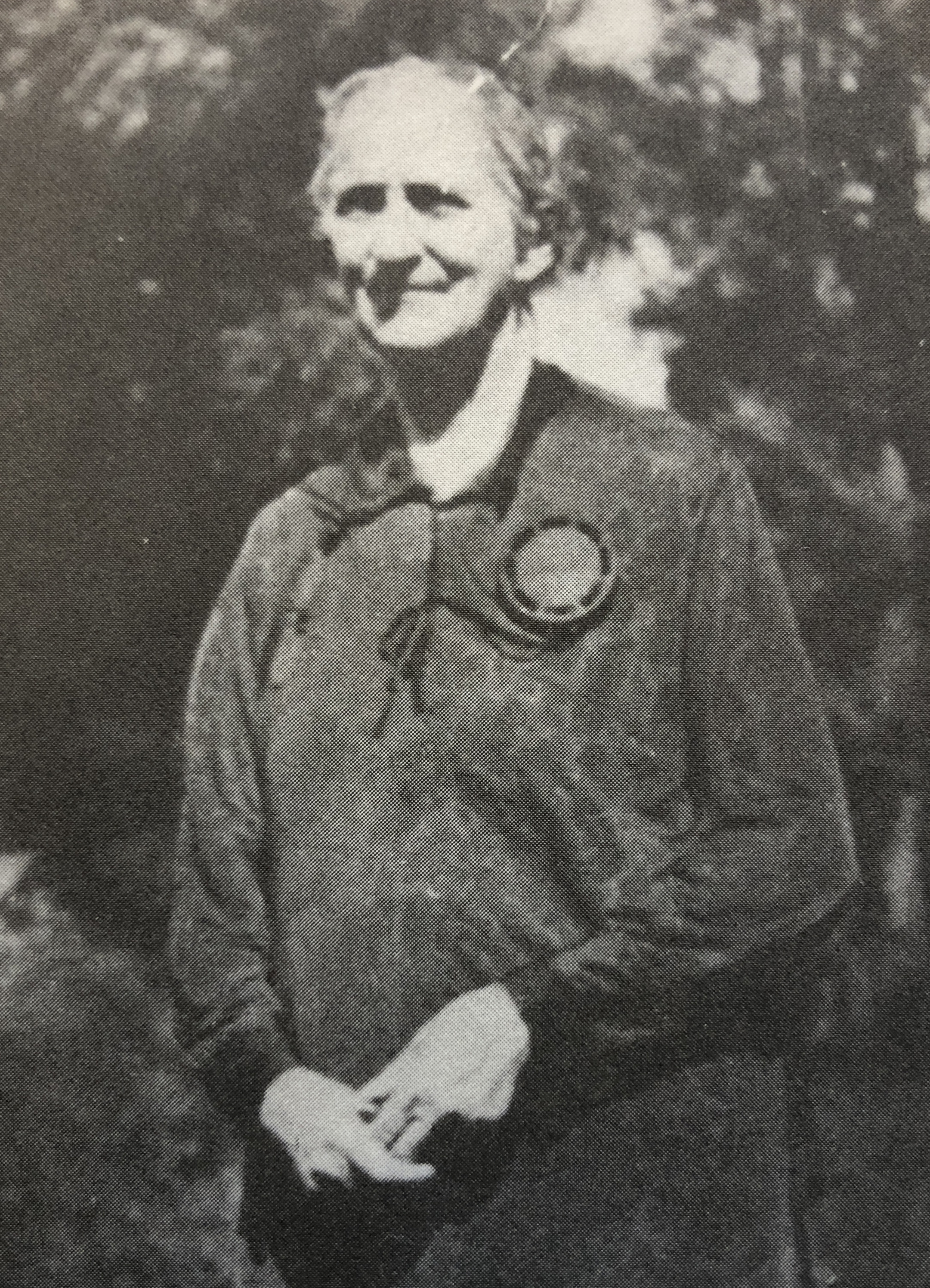
Mary Fisher in 1926

In the late 1880s, Mary Winter Fisher, a young woman doctor of homeopathy and surgery with a degree from Hahnemann Medical School, traveled from Chicago to found a medical and healing practice in Pagosa Springs.

In the 1930s Cora Woods built a geothermal swimming pool, and several small cabins on the Northeast corner of land she purchased from Bill Lynn, a local entrepreneur. There were a total of 23 cabins with no electricity, dirt floors, woodstoves, and oak iceboxes. In the 1950s the Giordano family purchased the property from Cora Woods. The Giordanos were European coal miners who had settled in the Walsenburg, Colorado area. They dug additional geothermal wells, and built an enclosed bathhouse next to the thermal water swimming pool.

In the 1980s Pagosa Springs received federal funding from the DOE to drill two geothermal wells to heat buildings in the small downtown area of the town. In the 1990s the town built a new pipeline and municipal bridge to deliver mineral springs water to a new resort.

== Water profile ==
Pagosa hot springs are the world's deepest geothermal hot spring. In 2020 the depth was measured by a collaborative team from the Center for Mineral Resources Science (CMRS) and the Colorado School of Mines and the U.S. Geological Survey. The measuring device went to a depth of 1002 feet, but the "tape measure" had reached its full extension. While the bottom of the spring was not found, this set a world record for hot springs depth.

The "Mother Spring" feeds dozens of primitive, rock-lined hot mineral water soaking pools located along the banks of the San Juan River that flows through the center of the town of Pagosa Springs, Colorado. These hot springs are free of cost and open to the public 24 hours per day. The Mother Spring also feeds developed, private soaking pools at three locations in town.

The mineral content of the waters consist of arsenic 0.12 mg/L, boron 1.8 mg/L, chloride 180 mg/L, fluoride, 4.3 mg/L iron 0.08 mg/L, lithium 2.9 mg/L, manganese 0.23 mg/L, magnesium 25 mg/L, potassium 90 mg/L, silica 25 mg/L, sodium 790 mg/L, sulfate 1400 mg/L, and zinc 0.01 mg/L.

== Geology ==
The Pagosa geothermal hot springs are located on the western slope of the Continental Divide. The sulfur-rich water emerging from what is called the "Mother Spring" has been measured between 110 °F (43 °C) and 144 °F (62 °C). The water originates from 6,000 feet below the surface from volcanic activity.

== 2026 flood ==
On October 21-25, 2026, the San Juan River and associated tributaries and creeks flooded due to heavy rainfall and an atmospheric river caused by a strong El Niño climate system causing heavy rainfall. The edge of Hurricane Trudy also factored in. The river crested at 15 feet. A week later the second wave of the flood came through, with the river cresting at 16.8 feet. Numerous hot springs soaking pools at The Springs resort were flooded with river water containing sewage.

== Gallery ==
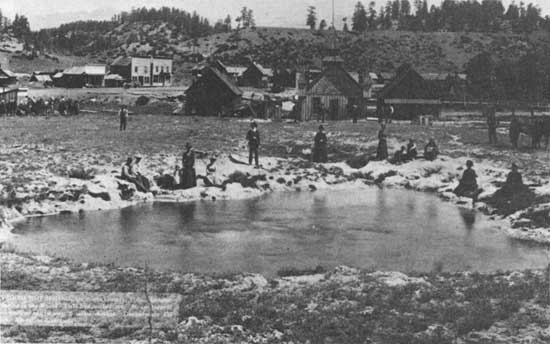
Pagosa Springs, Colorado, early 1890s

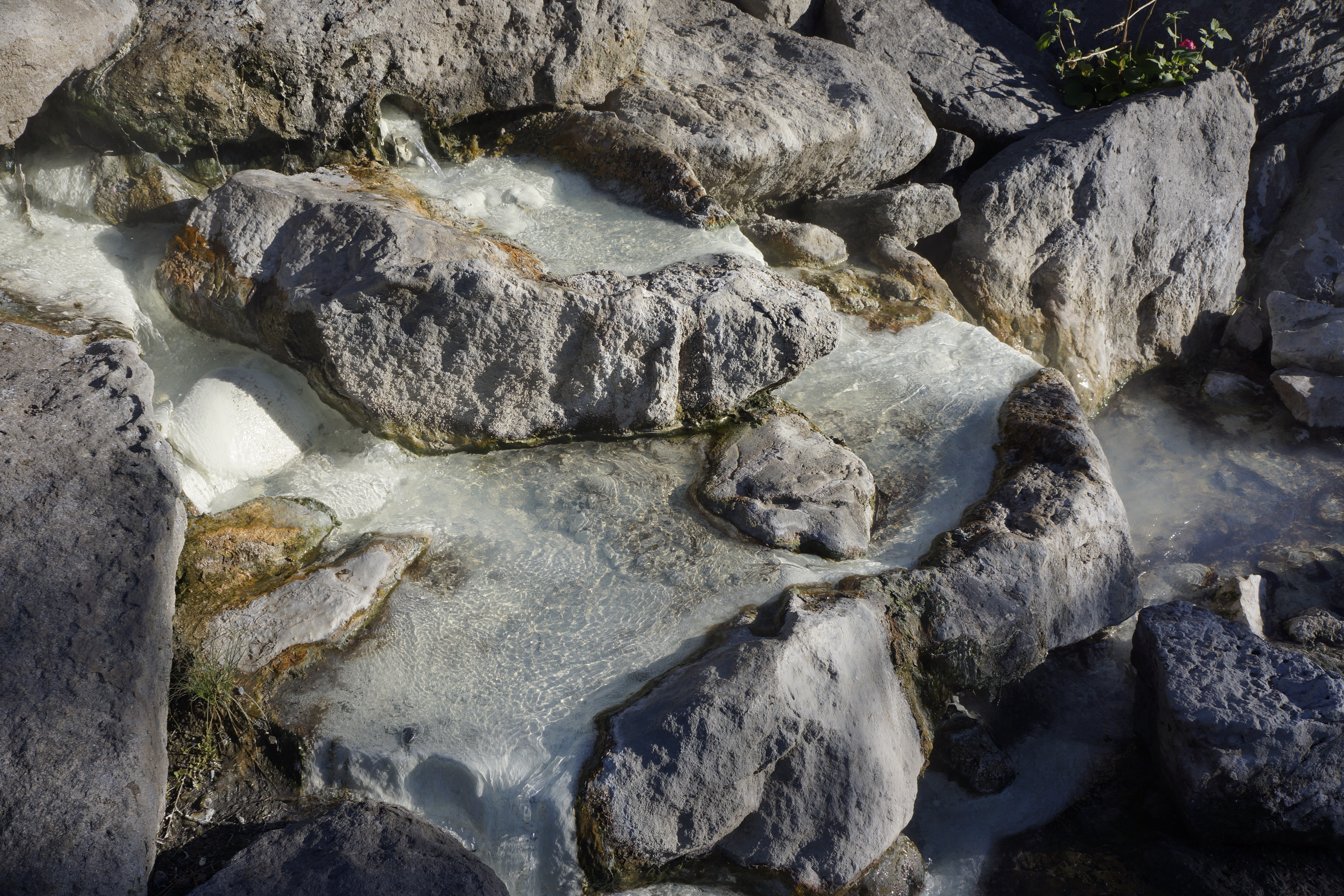
"foot bath" hot spring San Juan River

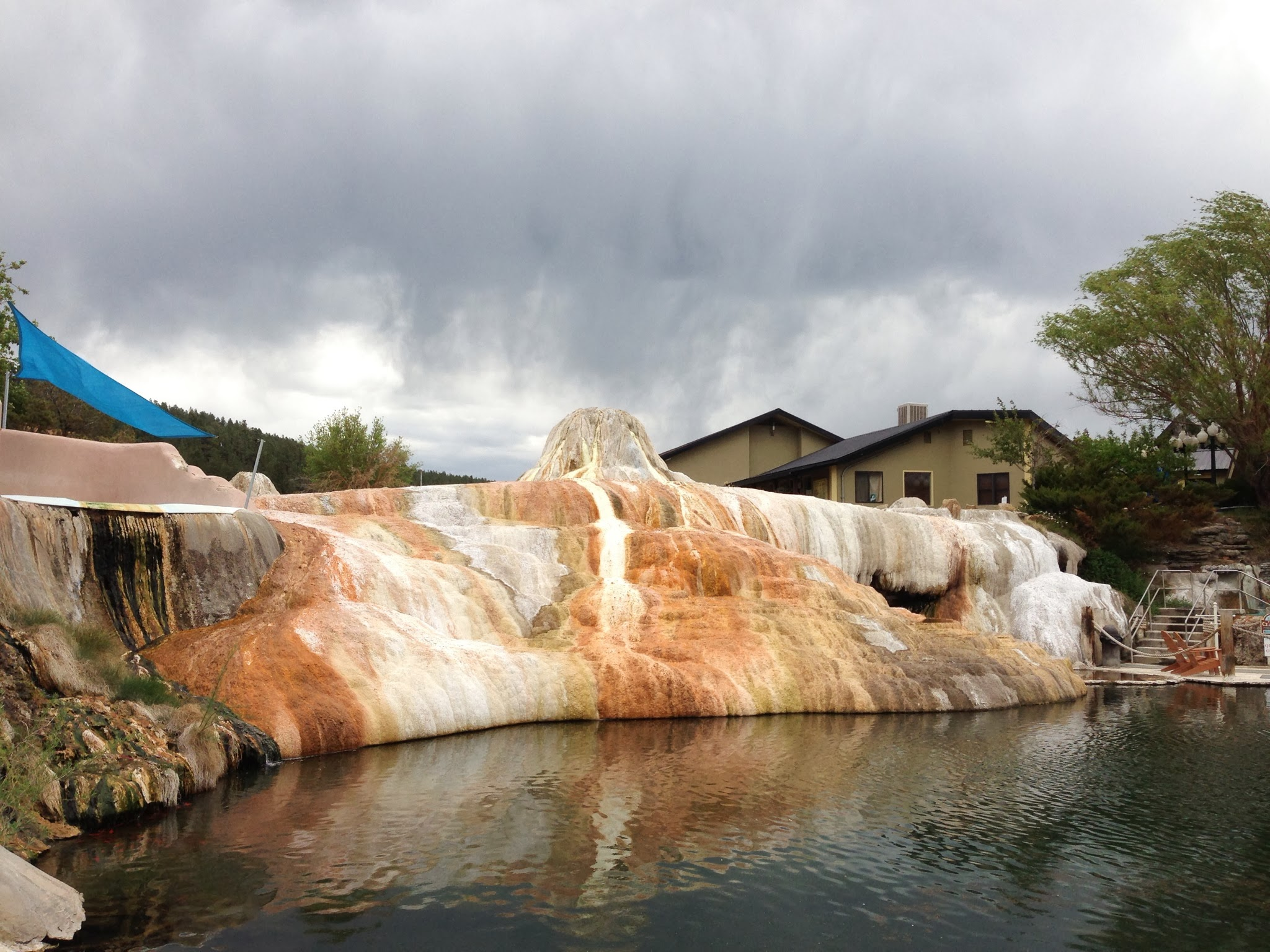
Sulphur formation at Pagosa Springs

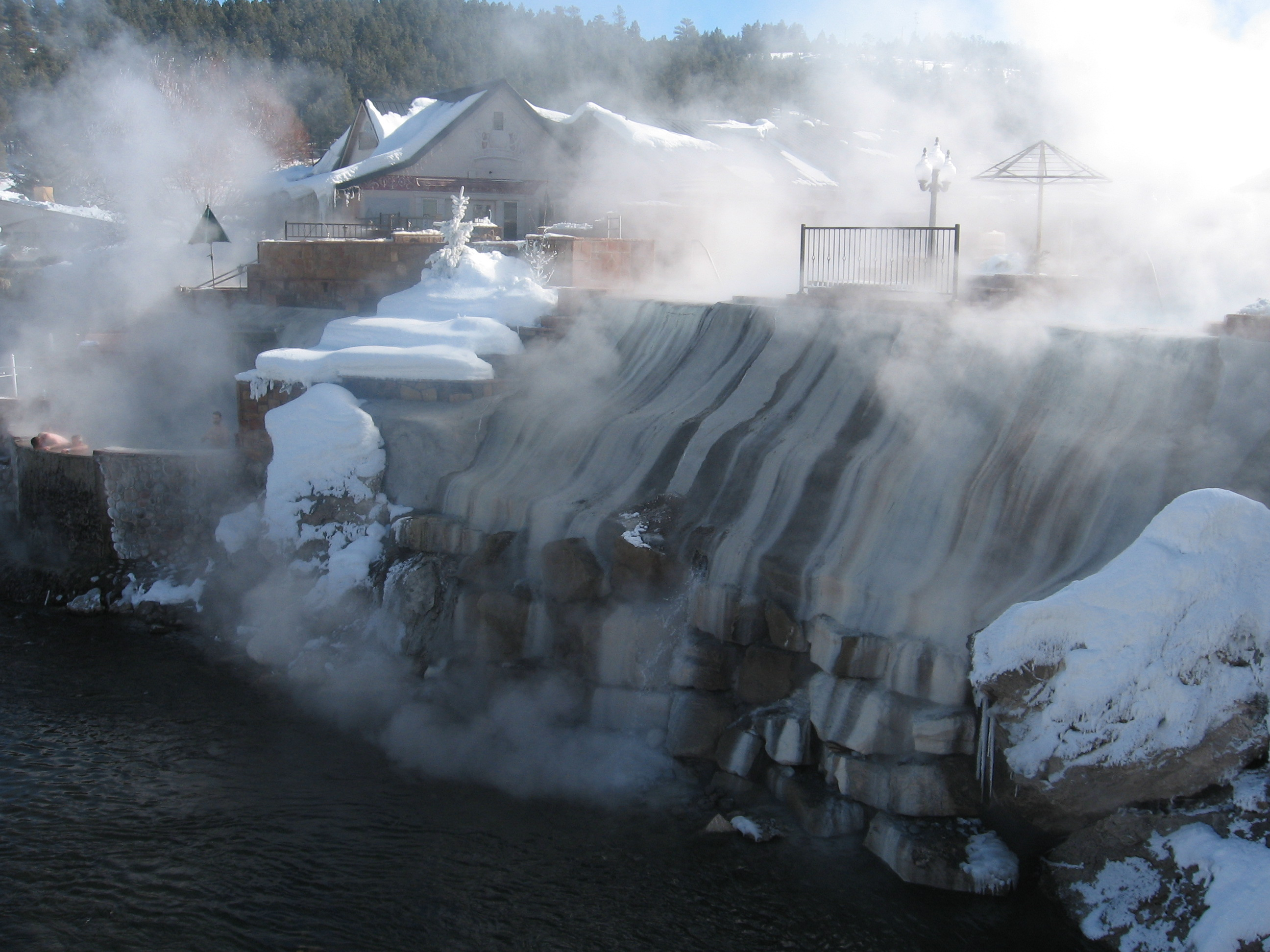
Hot Springs in winter

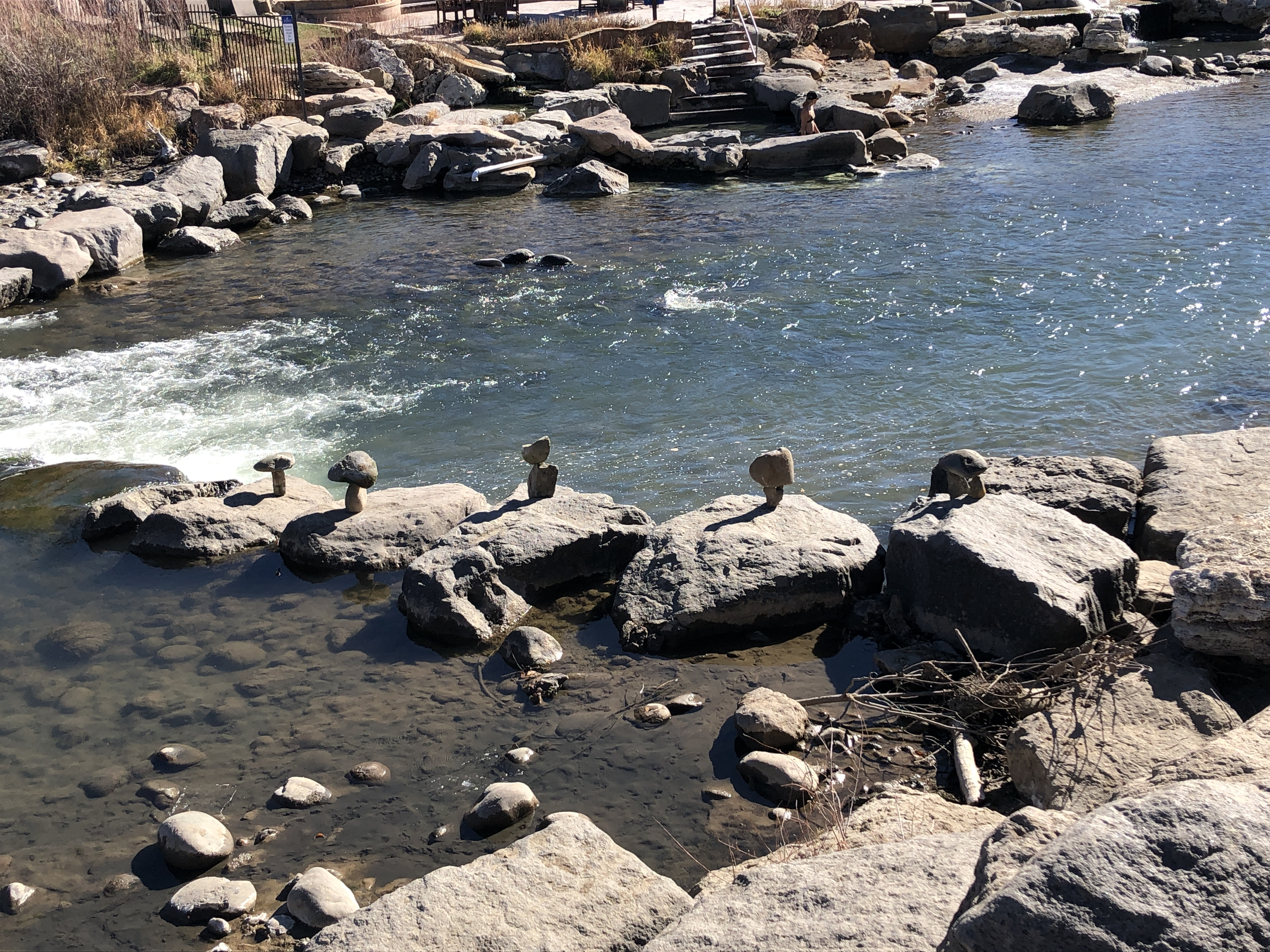
Public hot spring soaking pools along the banks of the San Juan River

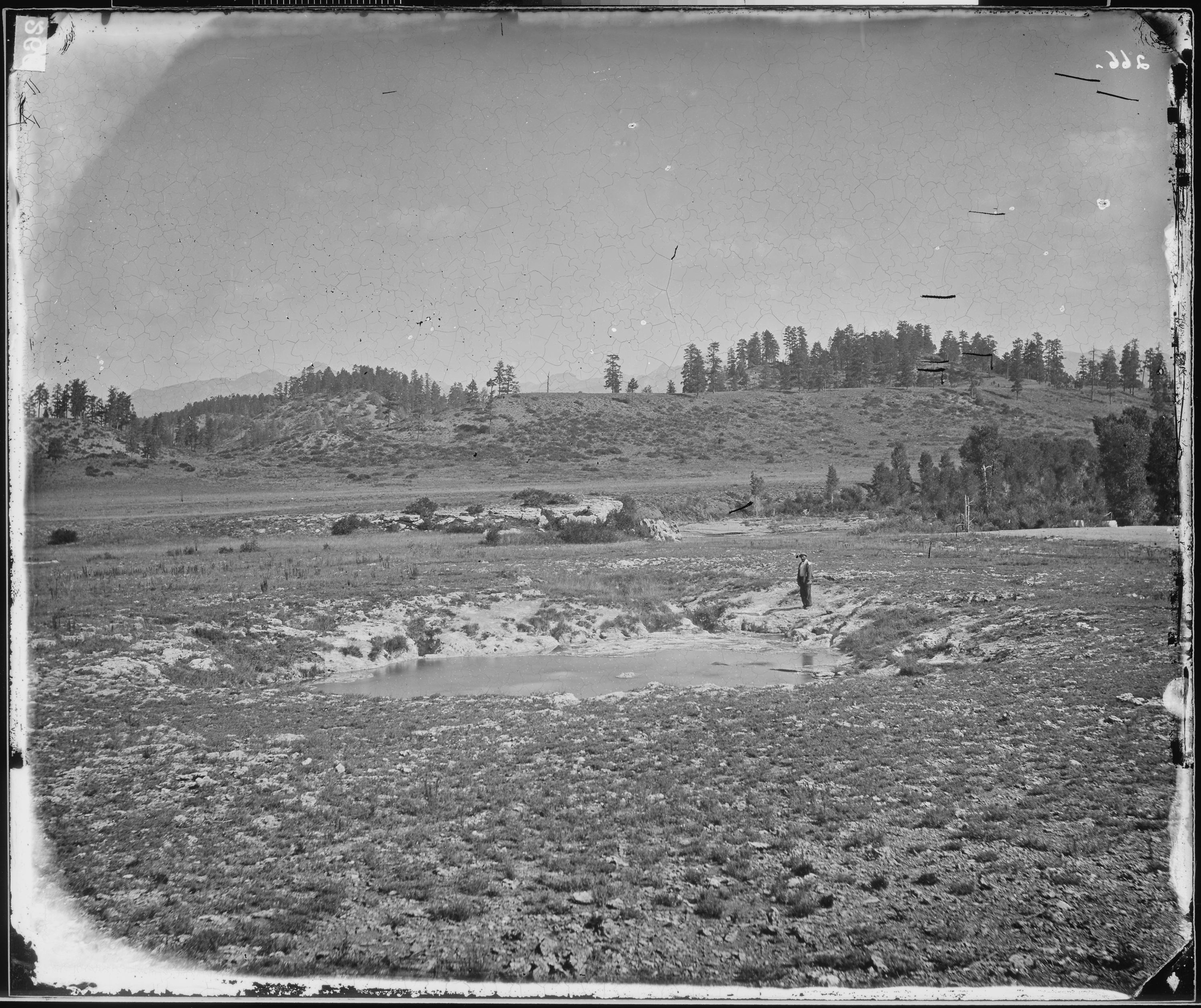
Pagosa hot springs in 1874, photograph: Timothy O'Sullivan

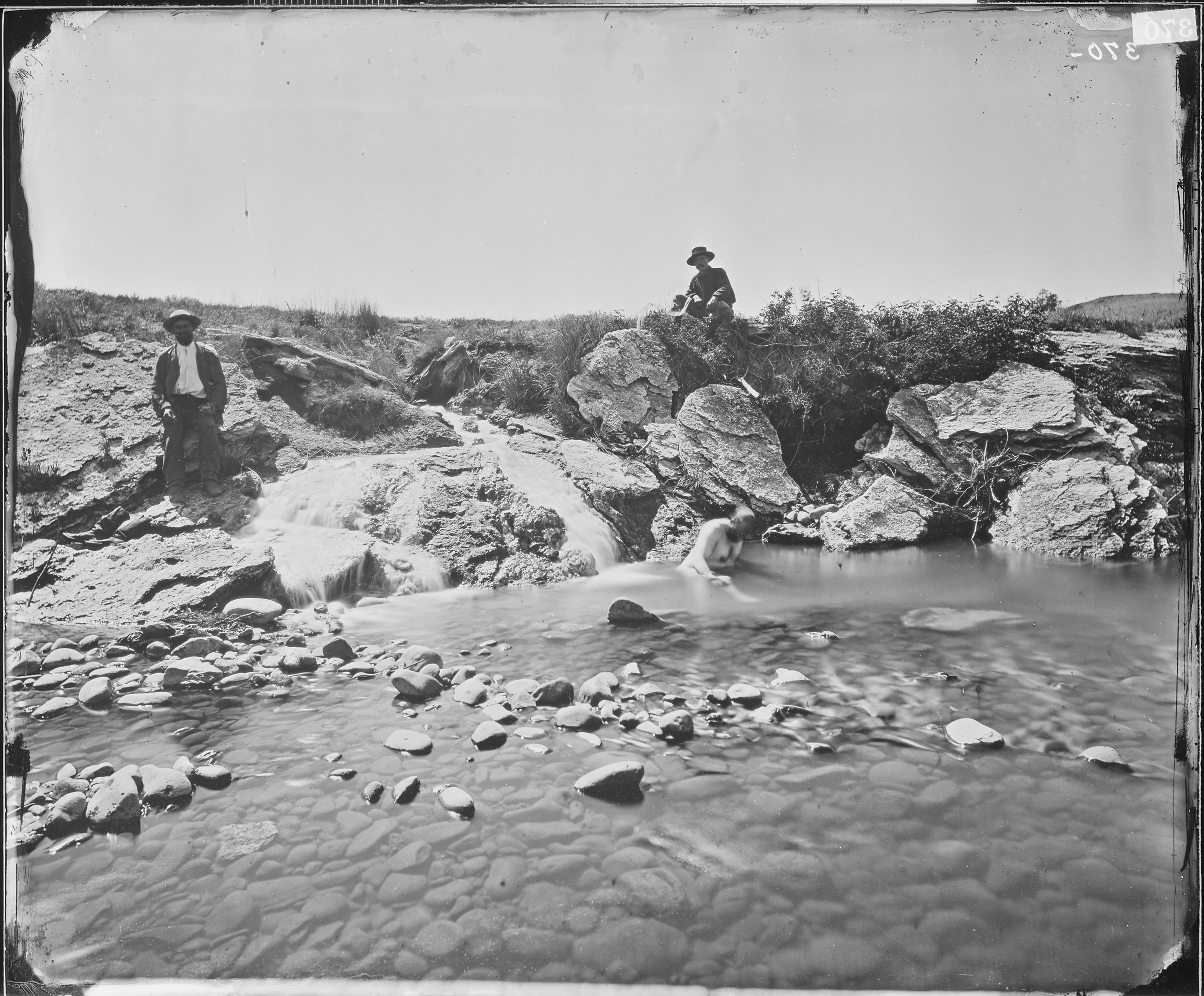
Man Bathing in Pagosa Hot Spring, 1874, photograph: Timothy O'Sullivan

== See also ==
- List of hot springs in the United States
- List of hot springs in the world
