= Rio Grande Sun =

Weekly newspaper in New Mexico, US

- October 10, 2013, Sun front page
- Type: Weekly newspaper
- Format: Broadsheet
- Owner(s): El Rito Media, LLC
- Founder(s): Robert E. Trapp; William J. Birkett
- Publisher: Richard Connor
- Managing editor: Jennifer Garcia
- General manager: Frank Leto
- Founded: October 1956
- Language: English
- Headquarters: Española, New Mexico
- Circulation: 12,000
- Website: riograndesun.com

The Rio Grande Sun is a weekly newspaper located in Española, New Mexico.

== History ==
On October 4, 1956, the first issue of the Rio Grande Sun was published. William J. Birkett was business manager and Robert E. Trapp was editor. In 1958, the Sun purchased and absorbed a rival paper called the Española Valley News. Trapp bought out Birkett in the early '60s and published the Sun until his death in 2014. He was succeeded by his son Robert B. Trapp. In 2022, El Rito Media, LLC acquired the paper.

== Film ==
In 2012, the newspaper was the focus of a documentary film titled The Sun Never Sets. The film was produced and directed by Ben Daitz and narrated by Bob Edwards.
