= Pagosa Springs, Colorado =

Town in Colorado, United States

Pagosa Springs
- Home rule town
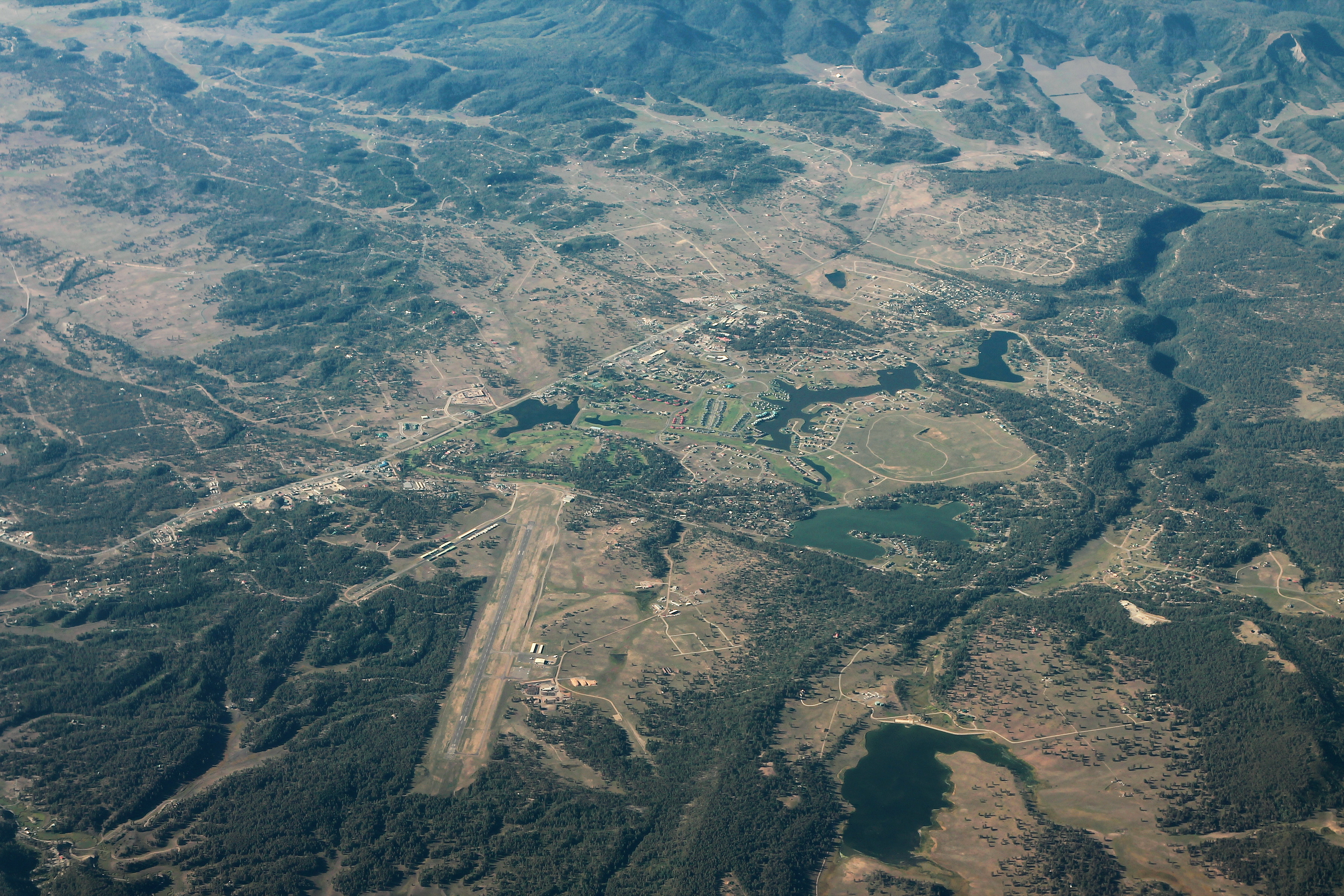
- Aerial view of west Pagosa Springs

- Location of Pagosa Springs in Archuleta County, Colorado.
- Coordinates: 37°15′50″N 107°02′20″W
- Country: United States
- State: Colorado
- County: Archuleta
- Incorporated (town): March 18, 1891

Government
  - Type: Home rule municipality
  - Mayor: Shari Pierce

Area
  - Total: 5.06 sq mi (13.10 km^{2})
  - Land: 5.03 sq mi (13.04 km^{2})
  - Water: 0.027 sq mi (0.07 km^{2})
- Elevation: 7,110 ft (2,170 m)

Population (2020)
  - Total: 1,571
  - Density: 312.0/sq mi (120.5/km^{2})
- Time zone: UTC-7 (Mountain (MST))
  - Summer (DST): UTC-6 (MDT)
- ZIP Codes: 81147, 81157 (PO Box)
- Area code: 970
- GNIS feature ID: 2413099
- FIPS code: 08-56860
- Website: www.pagosasprings.co.gov

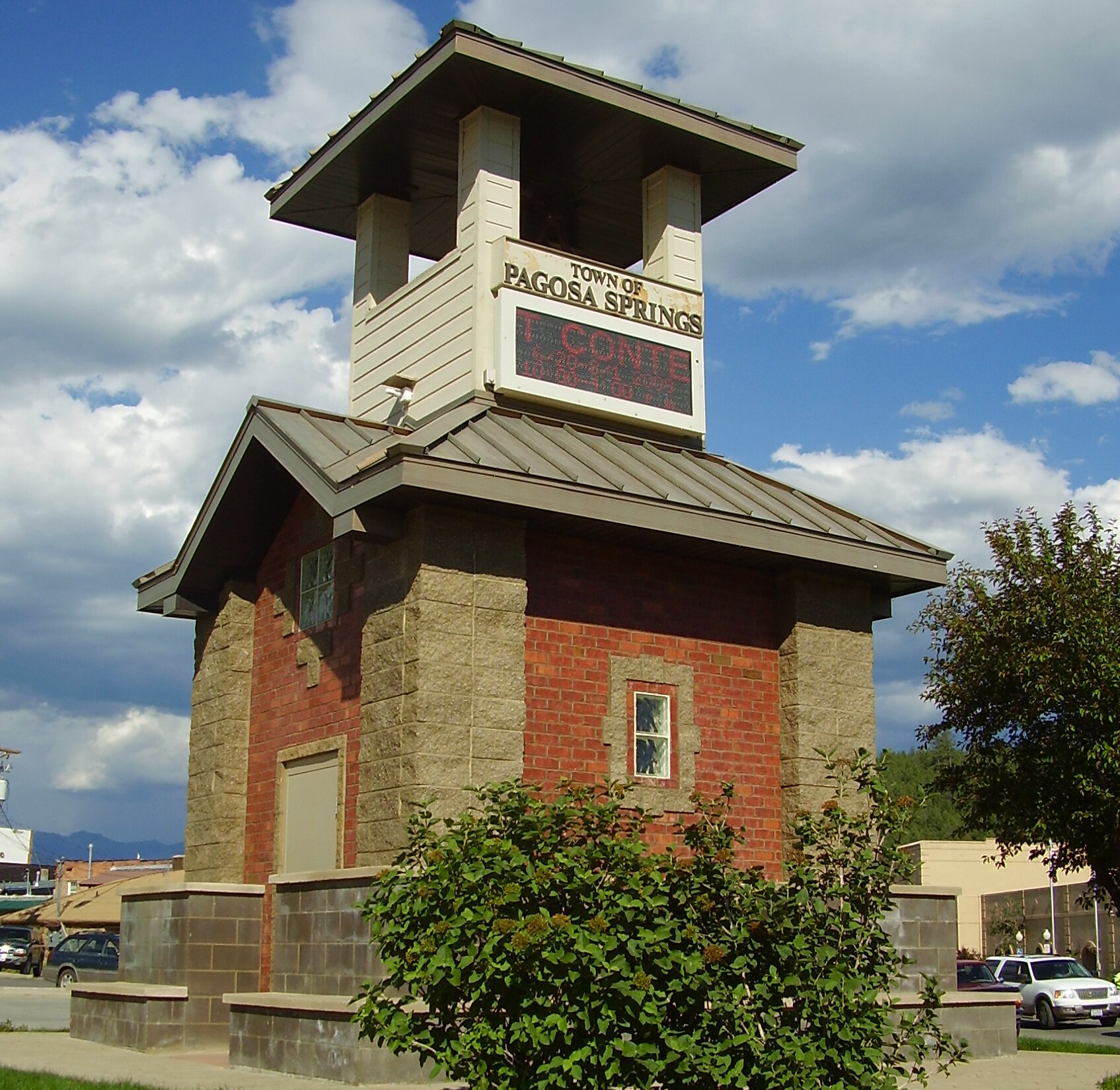
Tower at Pagosa Springs

Pagosa Springs (Ute language: Pagwöösa, Navajo language: Tó Sido Háálį́) is a home rule municipality that is the county seat, most populous community, and only incorporated municipality in Archuleta County, Colorado, United States. As of the 2020 census, its population was 1,571.

== History ==
The town is named for a system of sulfur springs, Pagosa hot springs, located there, which includes the world's deepest geothermal hot spring. The "Mother" spring feeds primitive and developed hot springs located on the upper banks of the San Juan River, which flows through town. The primitive springs are freely accessible to the public, but are generally not for entering or interacting with because of the extreme water temperature. Developed springs feed soaking pools that are hosted by three privately owned soaking locations within town. The water from the "Mother" spring is approximately 144 °F (62 °C).

Local indigenous people used the hot springs for centuries; the area was considered "sacred ground". In Navajo cosmology, Pagosa Springs is the place where the People (Diné) emerged from their Fourth World underground to the Fifth World, this one, as Aileen O'Bryan records in The Dîné: Origin Myths of the Navaho Indians. In 1859, a white settler "discovered" the springs and developed them. In 1881, a bathhouse was first built there for paying customers.

The Ute people called the sulfur-rich mineral springs Pah gosah, which is commonly translated in modern documents as "healing waters"; however according to Bill Hudson writing for the Pagosa Daily Post, a Ute elder once translated the phrase as "water (pah) that has a bad smell (gosah)" whereas the Archuleta County government states that "pagosa" is a Ute word meaning "healing or "boiling water."

After the Civil War, the United States government considered building a convalescent hospital in Pagosa Springs. However, the hospital project was canceled, and the lands platted by the U.S. Army were sold to private parties who capitalized on the thermal mineral springs. Along the banks of the San Juan river, simple wooden bathhouses were constructed.

In the late 1880s, Dr. Mary Winter Fisher ventured west from Chicago to found a medical and healing practice in Pagosa Springs. The medical center in the town is named after her.

In the 1930s, Cora Woods built a geothermal swimming pool fed with water from the hot springs, along with several small cabins on the Northeast corner of land she purchased from Bill Lynn, a local entrepreneur. There were a total of 23 cabins with no electricity, dirt floors, wood stoves, and oak iceboxes. In the 1950s, the Giordano family purchased the property from Cora Woods. The Giordanos were European coal miners who had settled in the Walsenburg, Colorado area. They dug additional geothermal wells, and built an enclosed bathhouse next to the thermal water swimming pool.

In the 1980s, Pagosa Springs received federal funding from the Department of Energy to drill two geothermal wells to heat buildings in the small downtown area of town. In the 1990s, the town built a new pipeline and municipal bridge to deliver mineral springs water to a new resort.

=== 1911 flood ===
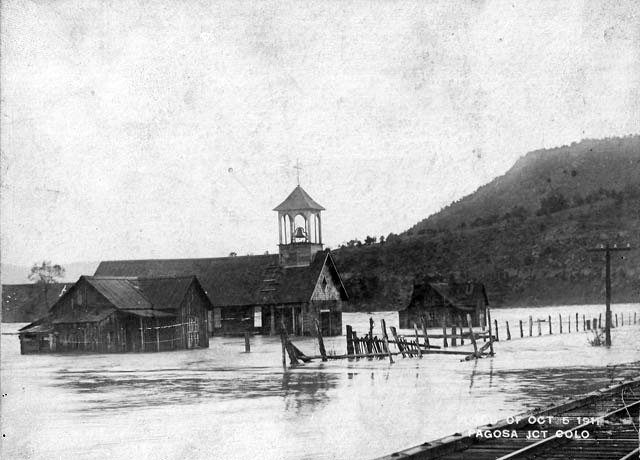
1911 flood, Pagosa Junction

On October 5, 1911, a flood occurred in Archuleta County, destroying the town's water supply pipeline and all the bridges throughout the county, including the bridges across the San Juan River. A cable was installed across the river providing residents a way to cross, and also to distribute food to those stranded by the flood. Many structures were damaged or destroyed including the electric plant. Train service as well as mail delivery halted in Pagosa Springs due to the train tracks being washed out.

== 2025 flood ==
On October 11, 2025, after heavy rainfall the night before, the San Juan River started overflowing and flooded the same day. Several bridges across the San Juan River were damaged, as well as a sewer line that was mounted on one of the bridges, that spilled sewage into the river. The hot springs soaking pools were inundated at The Springs resort with this muddy water and sewage from the flood. Debris, including whole trees, were carried downstream causing a failure of the sewage system lines resulting in a closure of a section of Highway 160,the main road through town, which was already undergoing construction on the town water infrastructure including water, sewer, and geothermal lines as well as the storm drainage infrastructure. Because of the flood damage, residents of Hermosa Street, San Juan Street and east of Hot Springs Boulevard were evacuated. The town called for an evacuation when the San Juan River was surging at 7,200 cubic feet per second. An emergency evacuation center was set up at the Ross Aragon Community Center at 451 Hot Springs Blvd. for evacuees displaced by the flood.

The community's Riverwalk Town Park (colloquially known as Pirate Park), was covered in water along with the neighboring Hermosa Street.

== 2026 flood ==
On October 21, 2026, the San Juan River began flooding due to heavy rainfall and an atmospheric river caused by a strong El Niño climate system as well as the remains of Hurricane Trudy. The town continued to flood until October 25, with the river peaking at 15 feet.

== Geography ==
Pagosa Springs is located 47 miles (75 km) east of Durango. The San Juan River flows through the middle of town.

According to the United States Census Bureau, the town has a total area of 4.88 square miles (12.64 km^{2}), of which 4.85 square miles (12.57 km^{2}) is land and 0.027 square miles (0.07 km^{2}), or 0.53%, is water. The area around Pagosa Springs has numerous large waterfalls, including Treasure Falls to the east of town off of Hwy 160 just past the Wolf Creek Pass summit.

Approximately 65 percent of the land in Archuleta County is either San Juan National Forest, Weminuche and South San Juan wilderness areas, or Southern Ute Indian reservation land.

Pagosa Springs is located approximately 35 miles (56 km) north of the New Mexico state line, at 7,126 feet (2,172 m) above sea level on the Western Slope of the Continental Divide. This combination of high desert plateau and the Rocky Mountains to the north and east creates an unusually mild climate, especially in the summer months. Pagosa sees around 300 days of sun each year, as well as four distinct seasons.

The town is located in the upper San Juan Basin, surrounded by the 3-million-acre (4,700 sq mi; 12,000 km^{2}) San Juan National Forest, and adjacent to the largest wilderness area in the state of Colorado, the Weminuche Wilderness.

=== Climate ===
Climate data for Pagosa Springs, CO (2000-2015 normals)
Month	Jan	Feb	Mar	Apr	May	Jun	Jul	Aug	Sep	Oct	Nov	Dec	Year
Mean daily maximum °F (°C)	37.9 (3.3)	42.6 (5.9)	49.2 (9.6)	59.2 (15.1)	68.3 (20.2)	78.3 (25.7)	83.1 (28.4)	80.7 (27.1)	74.3 (23.5)	63.7 (17.6)	49.7 (9.8)	39.6 (4.2)	60.6 (15.9)
Mean daily minimum °F (°C)	1.4 (−17.0)	7.0 (−13.9)	15.9 (−8.9)	23.9 (−4.5)	30.2 (−1.0)	36.3 (2.4)	45.2 (7.3)	44.6 (7.0)	36.6 (2.6)	26.3 (−3.2)	15.4 (−9.2)	5.0 (−15.0)	24.0 (−4.4)
Average precipitation inches (mm)	1.97 (50)	1.42 (36)	1.60 (41)	1.36 (35)	1.20 (30)	0.95 (24)	1.88 (48)	2.52 (64)	1.85 (47)	2.29 (58)	1.39 (35)	1.78 (45)	20.22 (514)
Average snowfall inches (cm)	26.4 (67)	18.9 (48)	15.1 (38)	5.5 (14)	0.9 (2.3)	0 (0)	0 (0)	0 (0)	0.1 (0.25)	3.2 (8.1)	10.0 (25)	21.2 (54)	101.5 (258)

== Demographics ==
Historical population
Census	Pop.	Note	%±
1880	223		—
1900	367		—
1910	669		82.3%
1920	1,032		54.3%
1930	804		−22.1%
1940	1,591		97.9%
1950	1,379		−13.3%
1960	1,374		−0.4%
1970	1,360		−1.0%
1980	1,331		−2.1%
1990	1,207		−9.3%
2000	1,591		31.8%
2010	1,727		8.5%
2020	1,571		−9.0%

=== 2020 census ===
As of the 2020 census, Pagosa Springs had a population of 1,571. The median age was 40.9 years. 23.0% of residents were under the age of 18 and 20.2% of residents were 65 years of age or older. For every 100 females there were 93.2 males, and for every 100 females age 18 and over there were 95.5 males age 18 and over.

78.8% of residents lived in urban areas, while 21.2% lived in rural areas.

There were 637 households in Pagosa Springs, of which 32.3% had children under the age of 18 living in them. Of all households, 41.1% were married-couple households, 19.5% were households with a male householder and no spouse or partner present, and 31.4% were households with a female householder and no spouse or partner present. About 28.5% of all households were made up of individuals and 13.1% had someone living alone who was 65 years of age or older.

There were 964 housing units, of which 33.9% were vacant. The homeowner vacancy rate was 5.7% and the rental vacancy rate was 27.9%.

Racial composition as of the 2020 census
Race	Number	Percent
White	1,061	67.5%
Black or African American	9	0.6%
American Indian and Alaska Native	54	3.4%
Asian	19	1.2%
Native Hawaiian and Other Pacific Islander	0	0.0%
Some other race	161	10.2%
Two or more races	267	17.0%
Hispanic or Latino (of any race)	523	33.3%

=== 2000 census ===
As of the 2000 census, there were 1,591 people, 633 households, and 415 families residing in the town. The population density was 363.1 inhabitants per square mile (140.2/km^{2}). There were 746 housing units at an average density of 170.2 units per square mile (65.7 units/km^{2}). The racial makeup of the town was 74.61% White, 0.50% African American, 2.20% Native American, 0.25% Asian, 18.73% from other races, and 3.71% from two or more races. Hispanic or Latino of any race were 43.18% of the population.

There were 633 households, out of which 32.4% had children under the age of 18 living with them, 46.1% were married couples living together, 13.6% had a female householder with no husband present, and 34.4% were non-families. 27.8% of all households were made up of individuals, and 10.3% had someone living alone who was 65 years of age or older. The average household size was 2.48 and the average family size was 3.07.

In the town, the population was spread out, with 27.6% under the age of 18, 9.4% from 18 to 24, 26.9% from 25 to 44, 24.8% from 45 to 64, and 11.3% who were 65 years of age or older. The median age was 37 years. For every 100 females, there were 96.4 males. For every 100 females age 18 and over, there were 94.3 males.

The median income for a household in the town was $29,469, and the median income for a family was $33,831. Males had a median income of $24,125 versus $21,406 for females. The per capita income for the town was $15,355. About 11.9% of families and 14.1% of the population were below the poverty line, including 14.6% of those under age 18 and 21.1% of those age 65 or over.

== Education ==
Archuleta County School District 50-JT operates the community's public schools. Pagosa Springs High School is the comprehensive high school.

== In popular culture ==
"Downtown Pagosa Springs" was the final destination for a duo of truckers in the 1975 country song "Wolf Creek Pass" by C. W. McCall. From Wolf Creek pass to town, U.S. Highway 160 goes through a vertical drop of 3,730 feet (1,140 m), and is described in the song as "hairpin county and switchback city".

== Notable people ==
- Dan Fogelberg, an American singer/songwriter
- Ursala Hudson (Tlingit), Chilkat and Ravenstail weaver
- Frank Oppenheimer, American particle physicist and professor
- Hugh Harman, American cartoonist and co-creator of Looney Tunes and Merrie Melodies
- Fred Harman, American cartoonist and co-creator of Red Ryder

== See also ==
- List of municipalities in Colorado
