= List of storms named Trudy =

The name Trudy has been used for four tropical cyclones worldwide: three in the Eastern Pacific ocean and once in the Australian region.

In the Eastern Pacific ocean:

- Hurricane Trudy (1990), a strong and long-lived Category 4 hurricane that churned in the open ocean
- Tropical Storm Trudy (2014), short-lived tropical storm that made landfall in Mexico
- Hurricane Trudy (2026), a Category 3 hurricane that approached the Mexican coast without making landfall

In the Australian region:

- Cyclone Trudy (1978) – a Category 4 severe tropical cyclone that affected East Timor and Indonesia
