= Dulce, New Mexico =

- Census-designated place
- Location of Dulce, New Mexico.

- Location in the United States
- Coordinates: 36°56′32″N 106°59′33″W
- Country: United States
- State: New Mexico
- County: Rio Arriba

Area
  - Total: 12.97 sq mi (33.60 km^{2})
  - Land: 12.83 sq mi (33.22 km^{2})
  - Water: 0.15 sq mi (0.38 km^{2})
- Elevation: 6,861 ft (2,091 m)

Population (2020)
  - Total: 2,788
  - Density: 217.4/sq mi (83.93/km^{2})
- Time zone: UTC-7 (Mountain (MST))
  - Summer (DST): UTC-6 (MDT)
- ZIP code: 87528
- Area code: 575
- FIPS code: 35-21390
- GNIS feature ID: 2408695

Dulce (/ˈdʌlsiː/ or /ˈduːsiː/; Jicarilla Apache: Lóosi) is a census-designated place (CDP) in Rio Arriba County, New Mexico, United States. As of the 2020 census, Dulce had a population of 2,788. It is almost entirely Native American. It is the largest community and tribal headquarters of the Jicarilla Apache Reservation.

== History ==
Dulce was founded by the Gomez family as a ranching operation. The original name was "Agua Dulce," Spanish for sweet water because of the presence of natural springs that provided good drinking water for the people and their animals. The original homestead was founded in 1877 by Jose Eugenio Gomez. The Jicarilla Apache reservation was established in 1887 when the Apache people were forced into a reservation. The Gomez Ranch is currently kept under Manuel Gomez ownership, though surrounded by reservation land.

The Denver & Rio Grande Railroad constructed its San Juan Extension through Dulce in 1882, and a post office was established in 1892. A sawmill was established here, and a logging railroad running southwest as far as Mills Lake from about 1914, both of which closed around 1930.

== Geography ==
According to the United States Census Bureau, the CDP has a total area of 12.9 square miles (33 km^{2}), of which 12.8 square miles (33 km^{2}) is land and 0.1 square miles (0.26 km^{2}) (0.8%) is water.

== Demographics ==
Historical population
| Census | Pop. | Note | %± |
|---|---|---|---|
| 2020 | 2,788 | | — |
U.S. Decennial Census

=== 2020 census ===
As of the 2020 census, Dulce had a population of 2,788. The median age was 31.5 years. 30.9% of residents were under the age of 18 and 9.3% of residents were 65 years of age or older. For every 100 females there were 97.3 males, and for every 100 females age 18 and over there were 96.6 males age 18 and over.

0.0% of residents lived in urban areas, while 100.0% lived in rural areas.

There were 917 households in Dulce, of which 38.4% had children under the age of 18 living in them. Of all households, 28.9% were married-couple households, 23.8% were households with a male householder and no spouse or partner present, and 36.1% were households with a female householder and no spouse or partner present. About 25.3% of all households were made up of individuals and 6.4% had someone living alone who was 65 years of age or older.

There were 1,105 housing units, of which 17.0% were vacant. The homeowner vacancy rate was 1.5% and the rental vacancy rate was 14.1%.

Racial composition as of the 2020 census
| Race | Number | Percent |
|---|---|---|
| White | 53 | 1.9% |
| Black or African American | 31 | 1.1% |
| American Indian and Alaska Native | 2,443 | 87.6% |
| Asian | 47 | 1.7% |
| Native Hawaiian and Other Pacific Islander | 1 | 0.0% |
| Some other race | 53 | 1.9% |
| Two or more races | 160 | 5.7% |
| Hispanic or Latino (of any race) | 315 | 11.3% |

=== 2010 census ===
By 2010, the population had increased 4.8% to 2,743 people. The population quoted above for 2000 is slightly off. The Census Bureau reports 2,618 people at that time; perhaps there was a revision of the 2000 figures.

=== 2000 census ===
As of the census of 2000, there were 2,623 people, 779 households, and 595 families residing in the CDP. The population density was 202.6 inhabitants per square mile (78.2/km^{2}). There were 899 housing units at an average density of 69.4 per square mile (26.8/km^{2}). The racial makeup of the CDP is 3.43% White, 0.04% African American, 90.66% Native American, 4.35% from other races, and 1.52% from two or more races. Hispanic or Latino of any race were 11.74% of the population.

There were 779 households, out of which 48.7% had children under the age of 18 living with them, 38.8% were married couples living together, 28.9% had a female householder with no husband present, and 23.6% were non-families. 19.9% of all households were made up of individuals, and 5.3% had someone living alone who was 65 years of age or older. The average household size was 3.34 and the average family size was 3.83.

In the CDP, the population was spread out, with 40.0% under the age of 18, 10.0% from 18 to 24, 29.2% from 25 to 44, 16.3% from 45 to 64, and 4.6% who were 65 years of age or older. The median age was 25 years. For every 100 females, there were 92.3 males. For every 100 females age 18 and over, there were 91.4 males.

The median income for a household in the CDP was $26,818, and the median income for a family was $29,402. Males had a median income of $26,055 versus $21,623 for females. The per capita income for the CDP was $10,108. About 24.8% of families and 29.5% of the population were below the poverty line, including 34.6% of those under age 18 and 41.4% of those age 65 or over.

== Climate ==
Dulce is the southernmost urban area with a subarctic humid continental climate in North America (Köppen: Dfc) where summer is mild and short due to high altitude and rigorous winter. Going further south than the Dfb in low altitude and in latitude similar to the southern limit of the Dfa in the center of the country.

Climate data for Dulce, New Mexico, 1991–2020 normals, extremes 1906–2021: 6793ft (2071m)
| Month | Jan | Feb | Mar | Apr | May | Jun | Jul | Aug | Sep | Oct | Nov | Dec | Year |
|---|---|---|---|---|---|---|---|---|---|---|---|---|---|
| Record high °F (°C) | 67 (19) | 68 (20) | 78 (26) | 83 (28) | 95 (35) | 103 (39) | 102 (39) | 99 (37) | 97 (36) | 89 (32) | 74 (23) | 66 (19) | 103 (39) |
| Mean maximum °F (°C) | 54.6 (12.6) | 58.6 (14.8) | 68.2 (20.1) | 74.8 (23.8) | 83.9 (28.8) | 92.1 (33.4) | 94.7 (34.8) | 91.4 (33.0) | 87.0 (30.6) | 78.7 (25.9) | 67.2 (19.6) | 56.0 (13.3) | 95.2 (35.1) |
| Mean daily maximum °F (°C) | 43.6 (6.4) | 47.8 (8.8) | 56.6 (13.7) | 64.1 (17.8) | 73.6 (23.1) | 84.2 (29.0) | 88.2 (31.2) | 85.4 (29.7) | 78.9 (26.1) | 67.6 (19.8) | 54.1 (12.3) | 43.7 (6.5) | 65.7 (18.7) |
| Daily mean °F (°C) | 26.9 (−2.8) | 31.8 (−0.1) | 39.5 (4.2) | 45.8 (7.7) | 53.7 (12.1) | 62.4 (16.9) | 68.9 (20.5) | 67.3 (19.6) | 59.8 (15.4) | 48.3 (9.1) | 36.9 (2.7) | 27.8 (−2.3) | 47.4 (8.6) |
| Mean daily minimum °F (°C) | 10.2 (−12.1) | 15.8 (−9.0) | 22.3 (−5.4) | 27.5 (−2.5) | 33.9 (1.1) | 40.7 (4.8) | 49.6 (9.8) | 49.1 (9.5) | 40.6 (4.8) | 29.0 (−1.7) | 19.7 (−6.8) | 11.9 (−11.2) | 29.2 (−1.6) |
| Mean minimum °F (°C) | −10.3 (−23.5) | −5.3 (−20.7) | 5.8 (−14.6) | 15.0 (−9.4) | 22.5 (−5.3) | 29.9 (−1.2) | 38.1 (3.4) | 39.1 (3.9) | 27.1 (−2.7) | 15.4 (−9.2) | 3.5 (−15.8) | −9.2 (−22.9) | −14.8 (−26.0) |
| Record low °F (°C) | −41 (−41) | −48 (−44) | −20 (−29) | −2 (−19) | 10 (−12) | 20 (−7) | 25 (−4) | 27 (−3) | 11 (−12) | 0 (−18) | −37 (−38) | −47 (−44) | −48 (−44) |
| Average precipitation inches (mm) | 1.46 (37) | 1.36 (35) | 1.14 (29) | 1.16 (29) | 1.09 (28) | 0.66 (17) | 2.08 (53) | 2.41 (61) | 1.72 (44) | 1.48 (38) | 1.32 (34) | 1.49 (38) | 17.37 (443) |
| Average snowfall inches (cm) | 13.4 (34) | 12.8 (33) | 6.3 (16) | 2.7 (6.9) | 0.4 (1.0) | 0.0 (0.0) | 0.0 (0.0) | 0.0 (0.0) | 0.0 (0.0) | 1.0 (2.5) | 5.7 (14) | 13.4 (34) | 55.7 (141.4) |
| Average extreme snow depth inches (cm) | 10.9 (28) | 9.8 (25) | 5.0 (13) | 0.4 (1.0) | 0.1 (0.25) | 0.0 (0.0) | 0.0 (0.0) | 0.0 (0.0) | 0.0 (0.0) | 0.5 (1.3) | 2.8 (7.1) | 6.9 (18) | 13.6 (35) |
| Average precipitation days (≥ 0.01 in) | 7.2 | 8.2 | 7.6 | 6.6 | 6.7 | 5.3 | 11.9 | 13.1 | 8.4 | 7.0 | 6.0 | 7.8 | 95.8 |
| Average snowy days (≥ 0.1 in) | 7.1 | 7.3 | 4.2 | 2.3 | 0.3 | 0.0 | 0.0 | 0.0 | 0.0 | 0.9 | 3.0 | 7.4 | 32.5 |
Source 1: NOAA
Source 2: XMACIS2 (records & monthly max/mins)

== Education ==
Children from Dulce attend the schools of Dulce Independent Schools, ISD 21, which has approximately 650 students from kindergarten to high school.

The Bureau of Indian Education (BIE) maintained the Jicarilla Dormitory, which took students in grades 1-12.

Jicarilla Public Library is in Dulce.

== See also ==
- List of census-designated places in New Mexico
- Dulce Base, alleged military base
