= 2014 Pacific typhoon season =

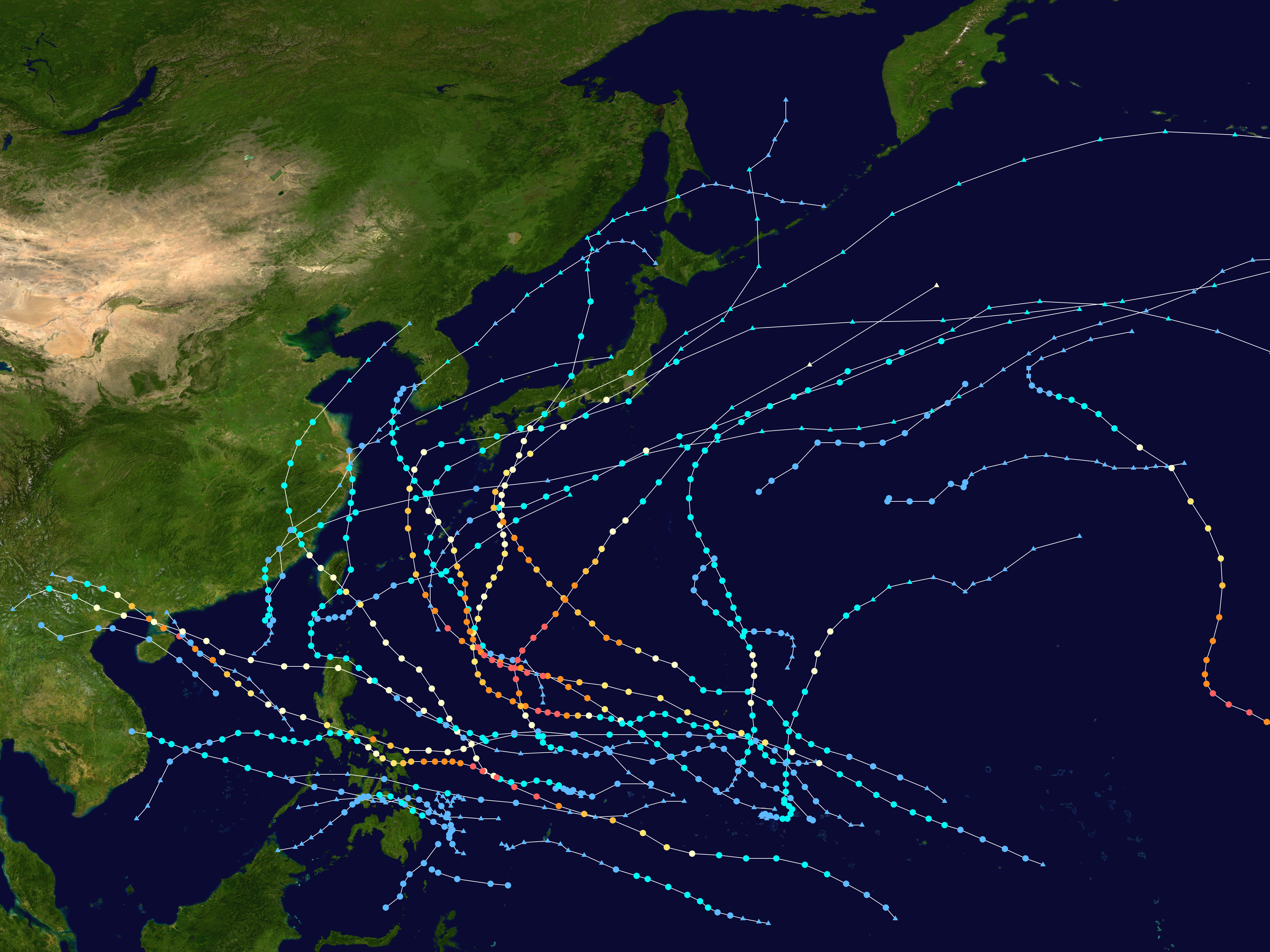
- Season summary map

Seasonal boundaries
- First system formed: January 10, 2014
- Last system dissipated: January 1, 2015

Strongest storm
- Name: Vongfong
  - Maximum winds: 215 km/h (130 mph) (10-minute sustained)
  - Lowest pressure: 900 hPa (mbar)

Seasonal statistics
- Total depressions: 32
- Total storms: 23
- Typhoons: 11
- Very strong typhoons: 8
- Violent typhoons: 5
- Total fatalities: 576 total
- Total damage: $13 billion (2014 USD)

Related articles
- Timeline of the 2014 Pacific typhoon season; 2014 Atlantic hurricane season; 2014 Pacific hurricane season; 2014 North Indian Ocean cyclone season

The 2014 Pacific typhoon season was a slightly below average season in terms of named storms, but featured the highest amount of Category 5 typhoons since 1997. This was mainly due to a developing El Niño that favors multiple powerful storms to form in the basin. The season formed twenty-three tropical storms (including one that crossed over from the Eastern/Central Pacific), eleven typhoons, eight super typhoons, and seven Category 5 typhoons. The season's peak months August and September saw minimal activity caused by an unusually strong and a persistent suppressing phase of the Madden–Julian oscillation (MJO). The season ran throughout 2014, though most tropical cyclones typically develop between June and October. The season began with the development of Tropical Storm Lingling on January 18, and ended after Tropical Storm Jangmi which dissipated on January 1 of the next year.

The season was not as active, deadly and costly as the previous typhoon season, but was notable for producing a series of powerful super typhoons. In fact, this season saw the most storms reaching Category 5 intensity on the Saffir–Simpson scale (seven–Neoguri, Rammasun, Halong, Genevieve, Vongfong, Nuri and Hagupit) since 1997. Two of those were notable; Rammasun became one of only four Category 5 typhoons recorded in the South China Sea with the others being Typhoon Pamela in 1954, Typhoon Rai in 2021 and Typhoon Yagi in 2024. The typhoon killed about 200 people and caused roughly US$8 billion worth of damage in China and the Philippines. Genevieve, a long-lasting system, was the first since 1999 for a system to exist in all three Northern Pacific basins.

The scope of this article is limited to the Pacific Ocean to the north of the equator between 100°E and 180th meridian. Within the northwestern Pacific Ocean, there are two separate agencies that assign names to tropical cyclones which can often result in a cyclone having two names. The Japan Meteorological Agency (JMA) will name a tropical cyclone should it be judged to have 10-minute sustained wind speeds of at least 65 kilometres per hour (40 mph) anywhere in the basin, whilst the Philippine Atmospheric, Geophysical and Astronomical Services Administration (PAGASA) assigns names to tropical cyclones which move into or form as a tropical depression in their area of responsibility located between 135°E–115°E and between 5°N–25°N regardless of whether or not a tropical cyclone has already been given a name by the JMA. Tropical depressions that are monitored by the United States' Joint Typhoon Warning Center (JTWC) are given a number with a "W" suffix.

== Seasonal forecasts ==
TSR forecasts Date	Tropical storms	Total Typhoons	Intense TCs	ACE	Ref
Average (1965–2013)	26	16	8	295	
May 6, 2014	27	17	11	375	
July 3, 2014	26	16	9	335	
August 5, 2014	26	16	9	328	
Other forecasts Date	Forecast Center	Period		Systems	Ref
January 10, 2014	PAGASA	January — March		1–2 tropical cyclones	
January 10, 2014	PAGASA	April — June		3–6 tropical cyclones	
June 30, 2014	CWB	January 1 — December 31		29–32 tropical storms	
July 7, 2014	PAGASA	July — September		8–10 tropical cyclones	
July 7, 2014	PAGASA	October — December		5–7 tropical cyclones	
	Forecast Center	Tropical cyclones	Tropical storms	Typhoons	Ref
Actual activity:	JMA	32	23	11	
Actual activity:	JTWC	24	22	13	
Actual activity:	PAGASA	19	16	9	

Every year several national meteorological services and scientific agencies forecast how many tropical cyclones, tropical storms, and typhoons will form during a season and/or how many tropical cyclones will affect a particular country. These agencies include the Tropical Storm Risk (TSR) Consortium of the University College London, Philippine Atmospheric, Geophysical and Astronomical Services Administration (PAGASA) and the Taiwan's Central Weather Bureau. During October 2013, the Vietnamese National Center for Hydro Meteorological Forecasts (VNCHMF) predicted that one to two tropical cyclones would develop and possibly affect Vietnam between November 2013 and April 2014. Within its January — June seasonal climate outlook, PAGASA predicted that one to two tropical cyclones were likely to develop and/or enter the Philippine area of responsibility between January and March while three to six were predicted for the April to June period. During March the Hong Kong Observatory predicted that the typhoon season in Hong Kong, would be near normal with four to seven tropical cyclones passing within 500 km (310 mi) of the territory compared to an average of 6.

On May 5 and 6, China Meteorological Administration's Shanghai Typhoon Institute (CMA-STI) predicted that 26-28 tropical storms would develop over the basin, while Tropical Storm Risk issued their first forecast for the season and predicted an active typhoon season. As a result 27 tropical storms, 17 typhoons and 11 intense typhoons were predicted to occur, while an ACE Index of 375 was also predicted by TSR. In late June Taiwan's Central Weather Bureau predicted that 29-32 tropical storms would develop over the basin, while three-five systems were expected to affect Taiwan itself. Within its July — December seasonal climate outlook, PAGASA predicted that eight to ten tropical cyclones were likely to develop and/or enter the Philippine area of responsibility between July and September, while five to seven were predicted for the October–December period. Within its two final forecasts for 2014, Tropical Storm Risk predicted that 26 tropical storms, 16 typhoons and 9 intense typhoons would develop over the basin.

== Season summary ==
A total of 32 systems developed throughout 2014, of which 23 reached tropical storm strength. Of the eleven typhoons, seven peaked at Category 5-equivalent intensity. Although the season featured below-normal activity overall, the season's first half was unusually active with eight named storms developing. Two of those storms, Lingling and Kajiki, both affected the Philippines during January, which is the first time since 1985 where two systems have developed during the month of January. In July, tropical activity increased, with most of the storms developing that month strengthening into typhoons. Moreover, all storms that developed during that month impacted land and caused significant damage and many casualties. In August, Genevieve, from the Eastern and Central Pacific basins, entered the West Pacific basin. However, no other tropical cyclones exceeded tropical storm intensity that month. This was largely due to a very strong, but unfavorable phase of the Madden–Julian oscillation (MJO), which hindered tropical cyclone formation.

Conditions for tropical cyclogenesis became more favorable during September with the formation of Tropical Depression Karding and Severe Tropical Storm Fengshen, although activity was still below-normal. During the same month, Kalmaegi and Fung-wong both impacted the Philippines, bringing torrential rainfall, causing flash flooding in many provinces. Typhoons Phanfone and Vongfong both became intense typhoons and affected Japan during October. Later that month, Typhoon Nuri developed and resulted in the formation of the 2014 Bering Sea bomb cyclone. Towards the end of the season, Typhoon Hagupit intensified into a Category 5-equivalent super typhoon before weakening and affecting the Philippines as a Category 3-equivalent typhoon. Hagupit caused much fewer impacts than Typhoon Haiyan of the previous year. The season's last named storm, Tropical Storm Jangmi, developed in December 28. Jangmi affected the southern Philippines and dissipated during January 1, 2015, making it the first storm in the Western Pacific to span two calendar years since Typhoon Soulik in 2000.

== Systems ==
=== Tropical Storm Lingling (Agaton) ===
- Tropical storm (JMA)
- Tropical depression (SSHWS)
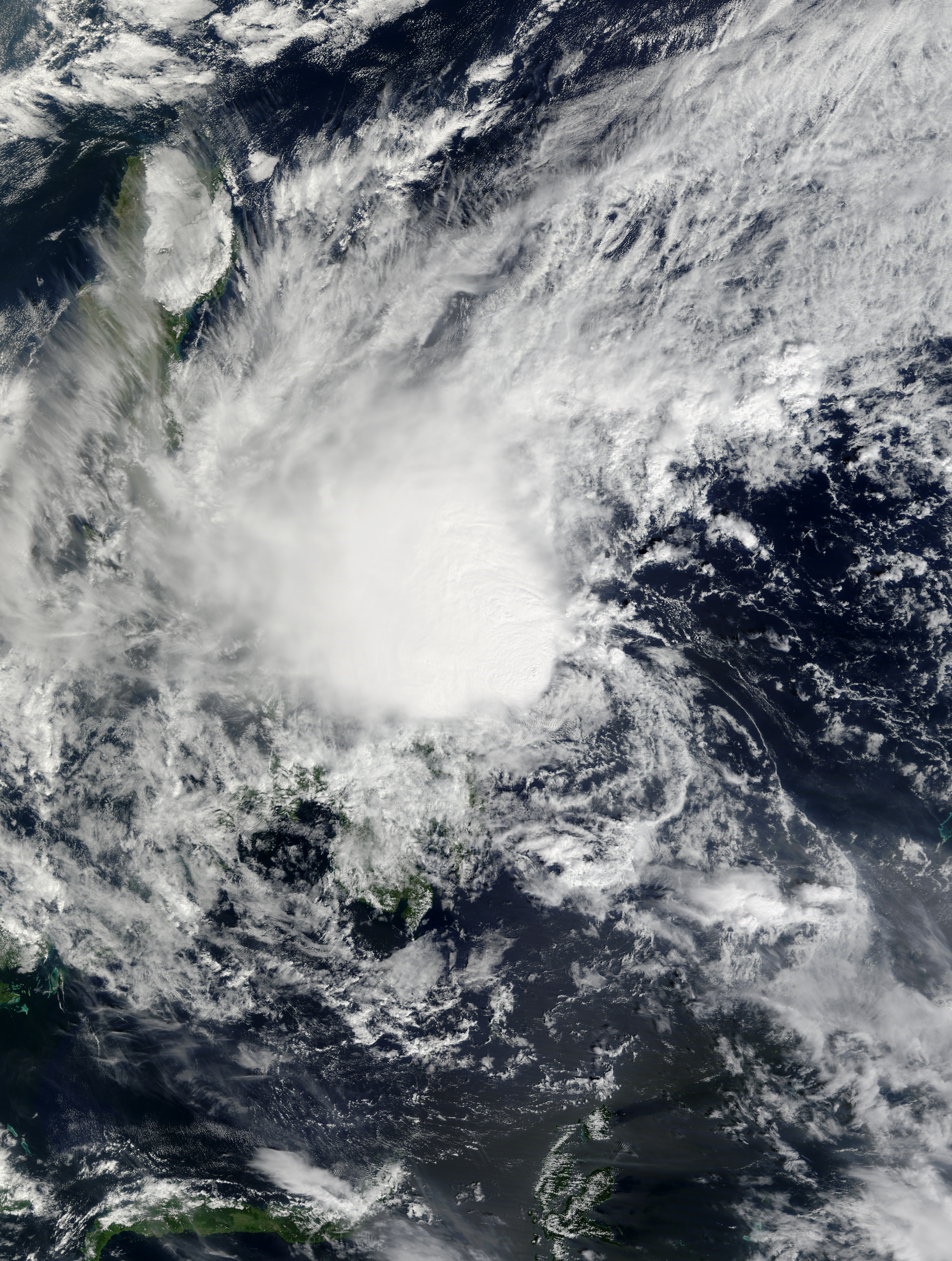
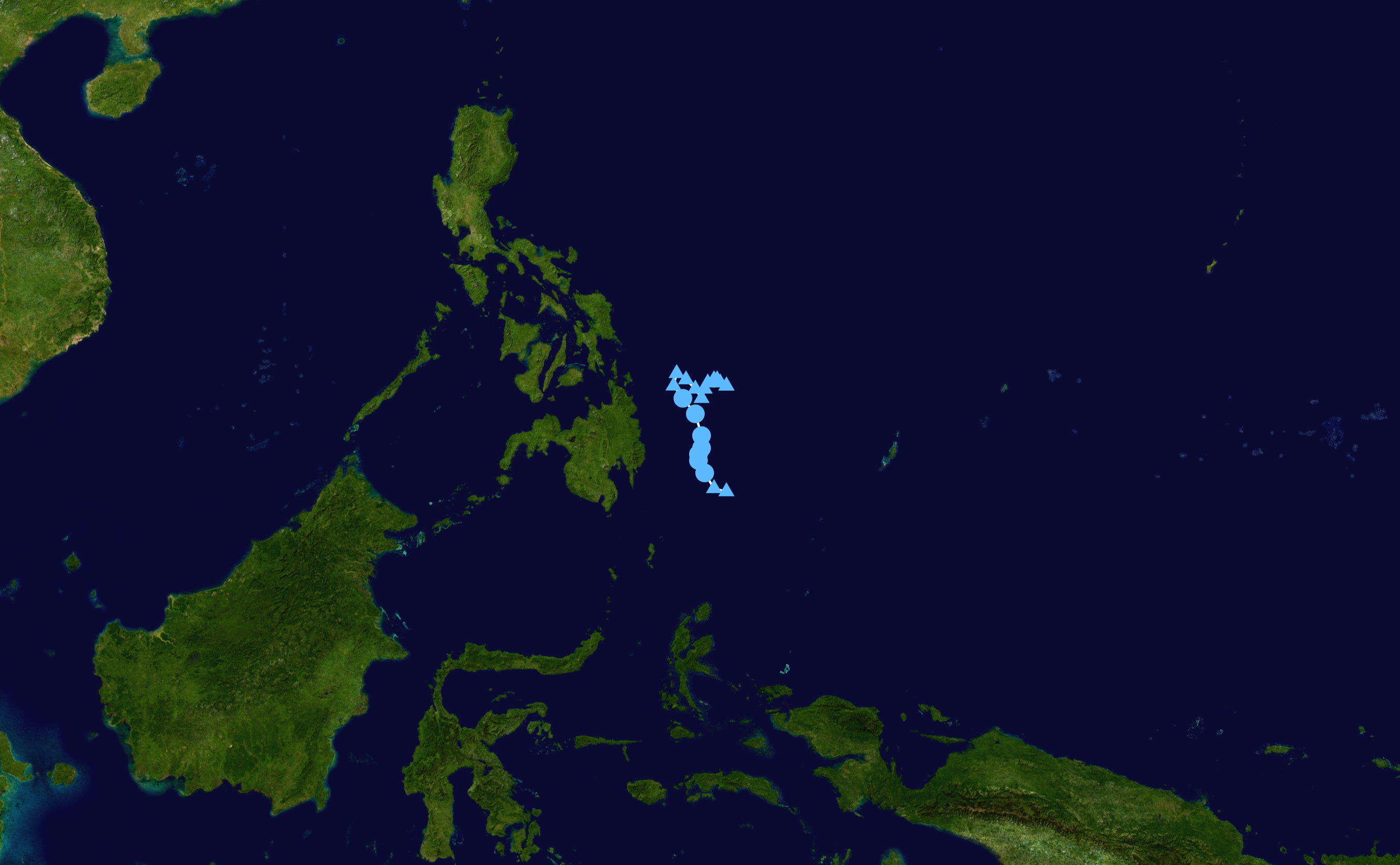
- Duration: January 10 – January 20
- Peak intensity: 65 km/h (40 mph) (10-min); 1002 hPa (mbar)

On January 10, the JMA reported that a tropical depression had developed, about 1,800 km (1,120 mi) to the southeast of Manila, Philippines. The JMA expected the system to develop into a tropical storm within 24 hours, despite it being located in an area of marginal conditions for further development. The JMA downgraded it back to a weak tropical disturbance on January 12, when convection became more disorganized. Although its remnants crossed Mindanao, Philippines on January 13 and emerged into the area off the northeast coast of Mindanao on the next day.

The system intensified into a tropical depression again on January 15 with the poor structure under high vertical wind shear and strong northeasterly surges, and the JTWC issued a TCFA on the system on the next day, for the consolidating structure and more favorable conditions. On January 17, PAGASA upgraded the system to a tropical depression and gave the local name Agaton. During the next day the JMA reported that the system had intensified into a tropical storm and named it Lingling. Six hours later, the JTWC upgraded Lingling to a tropical storm, based on the scatterometer data and Dvorak estimates; though post-analysis revealed that the system never strengthened into a tropical storm by the JTWC. Half a day later, however, the JTWC downgraded Lingling to a tropical depression, for significantly diminishing convection. The system was last noted by the JMA, during January 20, as it dissipated to the southeast of the Philippines.

Despite not making landfall as a tropical cyclone on the Philippines, the system brought considerable rainfall over several days to southern Mindanao that caused six flooding and sixteen landslide incidents. As a result the majority of the 70 deaths caused by the system in the Philippines, were as a result of landslides or people drowning. Other impacts caused by Lingling (Agaton) included damage to 3482 houses and flooding to the irrigation dams in Cateel, Davao Oriental. Overall the total cost of damages was estimated at PHP567 million (US$12.6 million).

=== Tropical Storm Kajiki (Basyang) ===
- Tropical storm (JMA)
- Tropical storm (SSHWS)
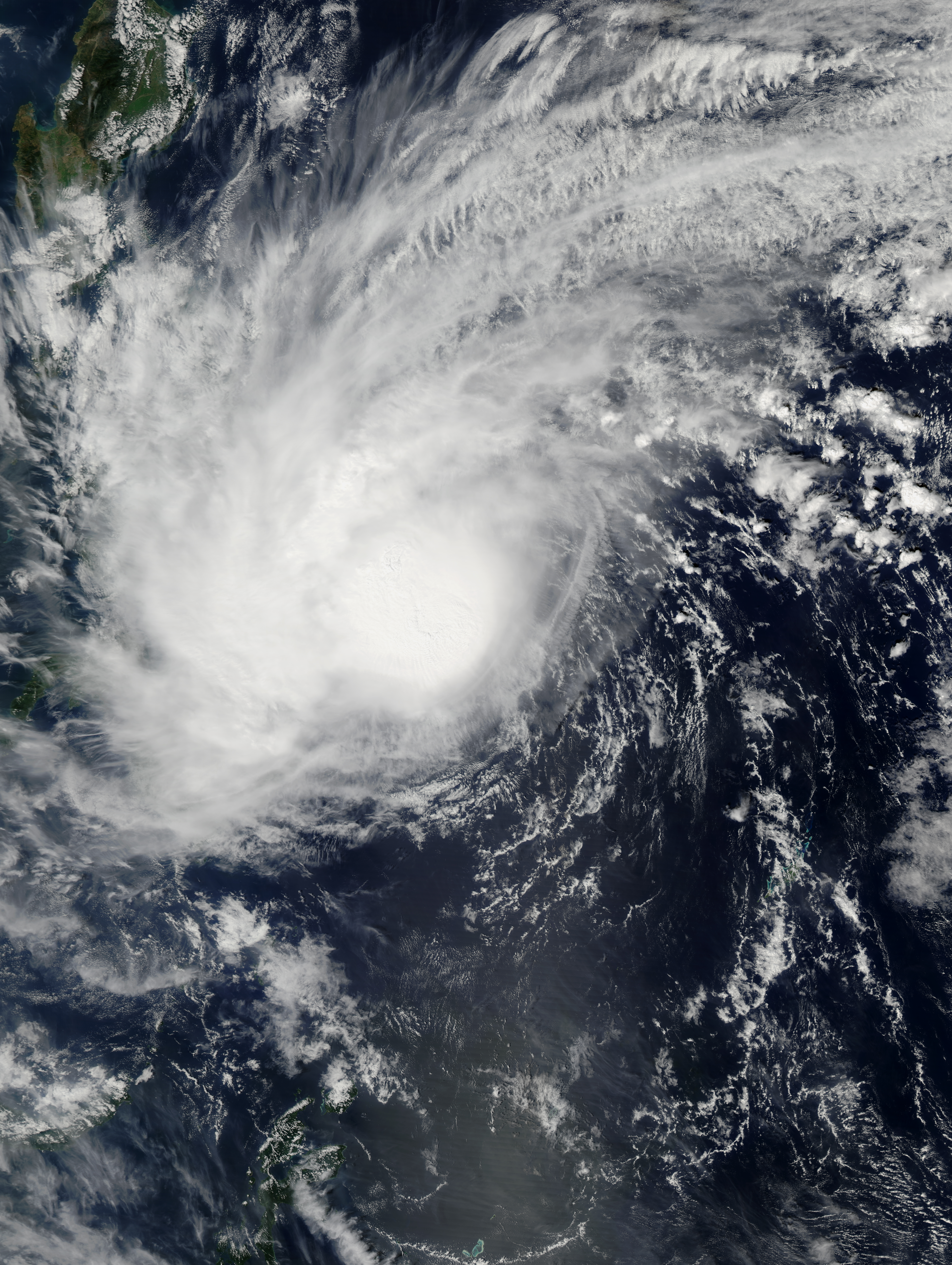
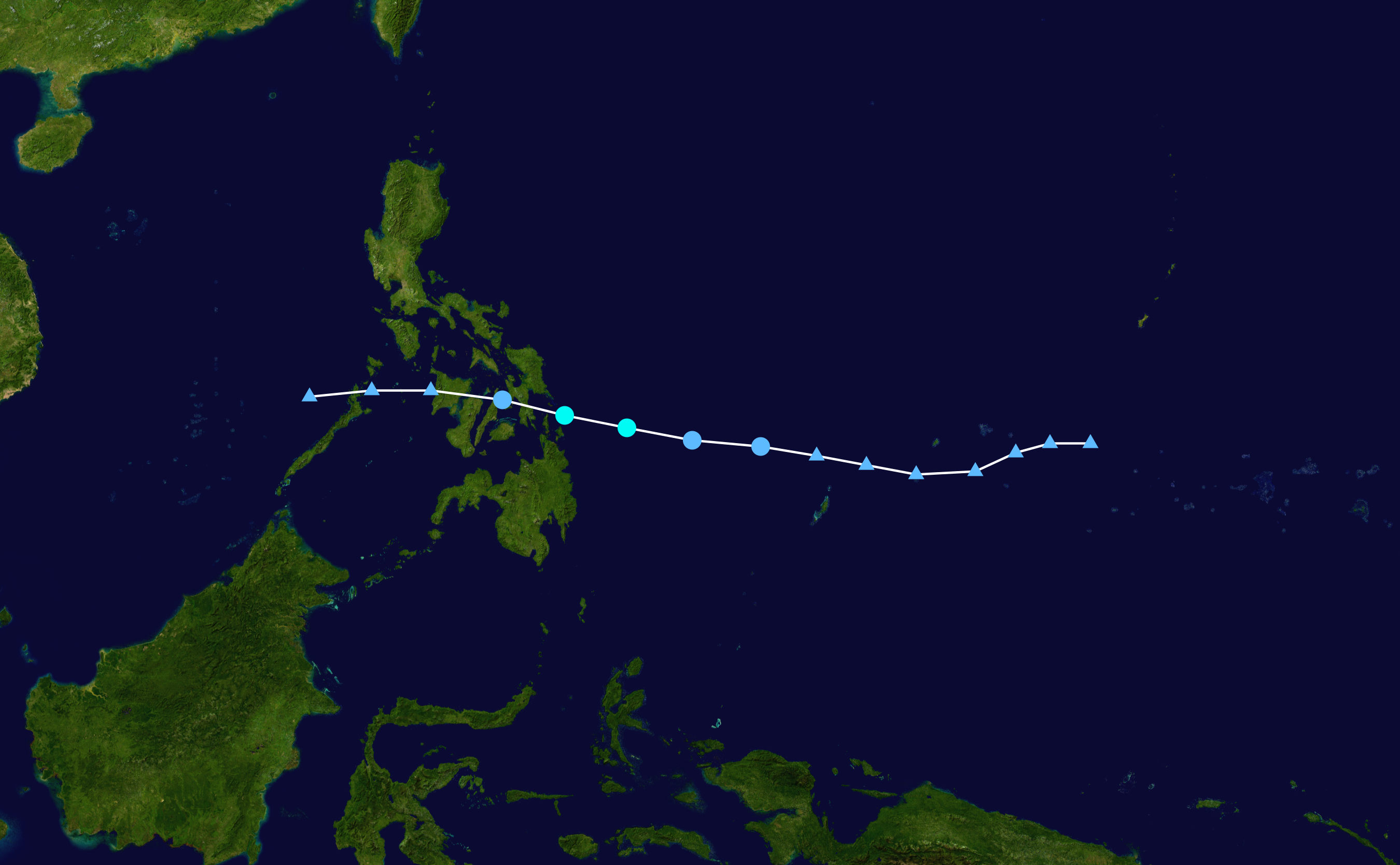
- Duration: January 29 – February 1
- Peak intensity: 65 km/h (40 mph) (10-min); 1000 hPa (mbar)

On January 29, the JMA reported that a tropical depression had developed about 475 km (295 mi) to the south-southeast of Hagåtña, Guam. Over the next day the system moved westwards within an area that was marginal for further development, with low to moderate vertical wind shear and moved into the Philippine area of responsibility. As a result PAGASA named the system Basyang during January 30, while the JTWC initiated advisories and designated the system as Tropical Depression 02W. The system subsequently continued to move westwards under the influence of the subtropical ridge of high pressure, before it reached its peak intensity as a tropical storm with wind speeds of 65 kilometres per hour (40 mph) during January 31. According to PAGASA, the storm made landfall over Siargao Island on January 31. Due to the unfavorable conditions in the South China Sea, Kajiki dissipated late on February 1.

Kajiki impacted the Philippines between January 30 and February 1, where a total of 13 landslides and 4 flooding incidents, were recorded in the provinces of Cebu and Southern Leyte. Overall six people were killed in the island nation while total damages were estimated at Php9.14 million (US$202,000).

=== Typhoon Faxai ===
- Typhoon (JMA)
- Category 1 typhoon (SSHWS)
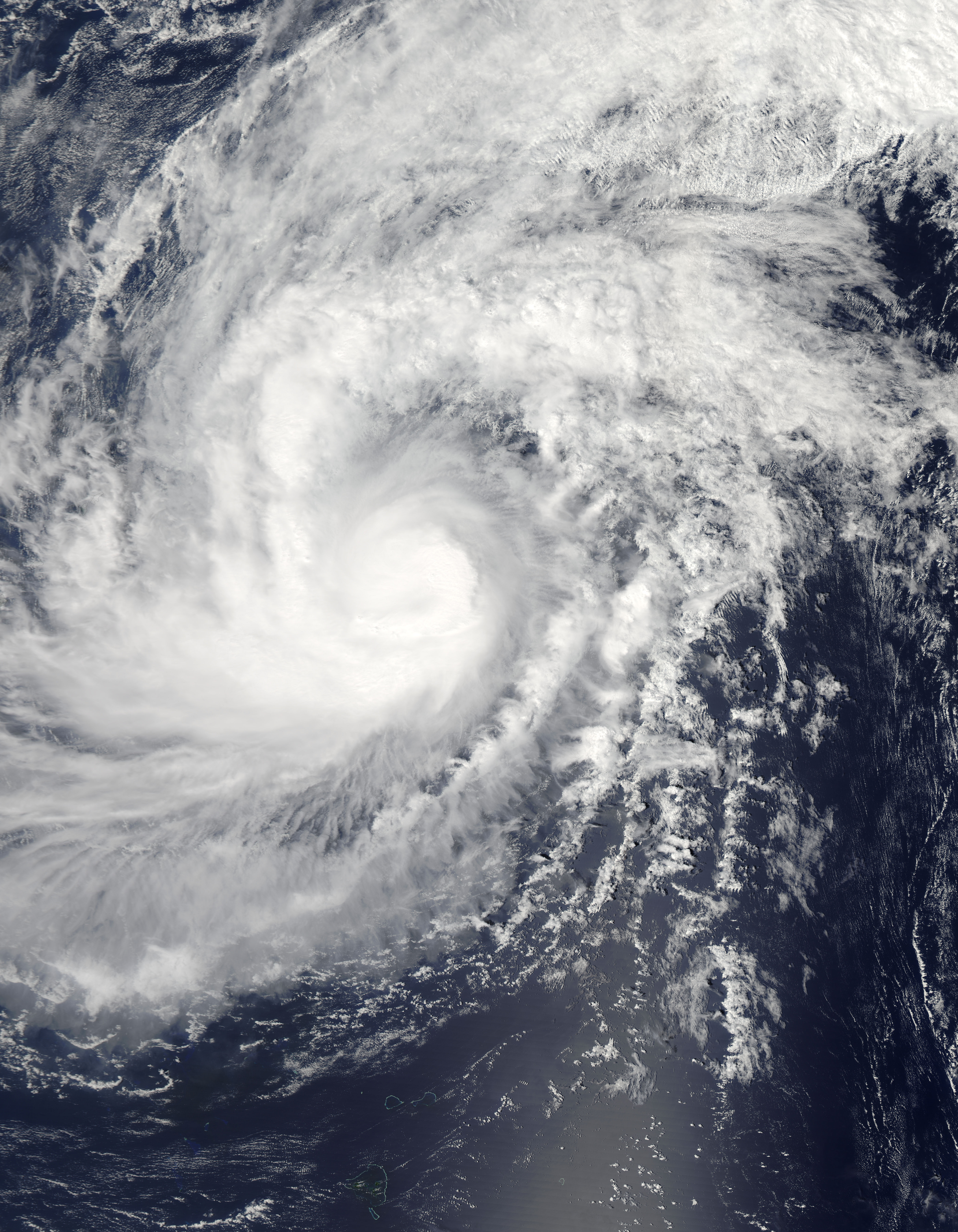
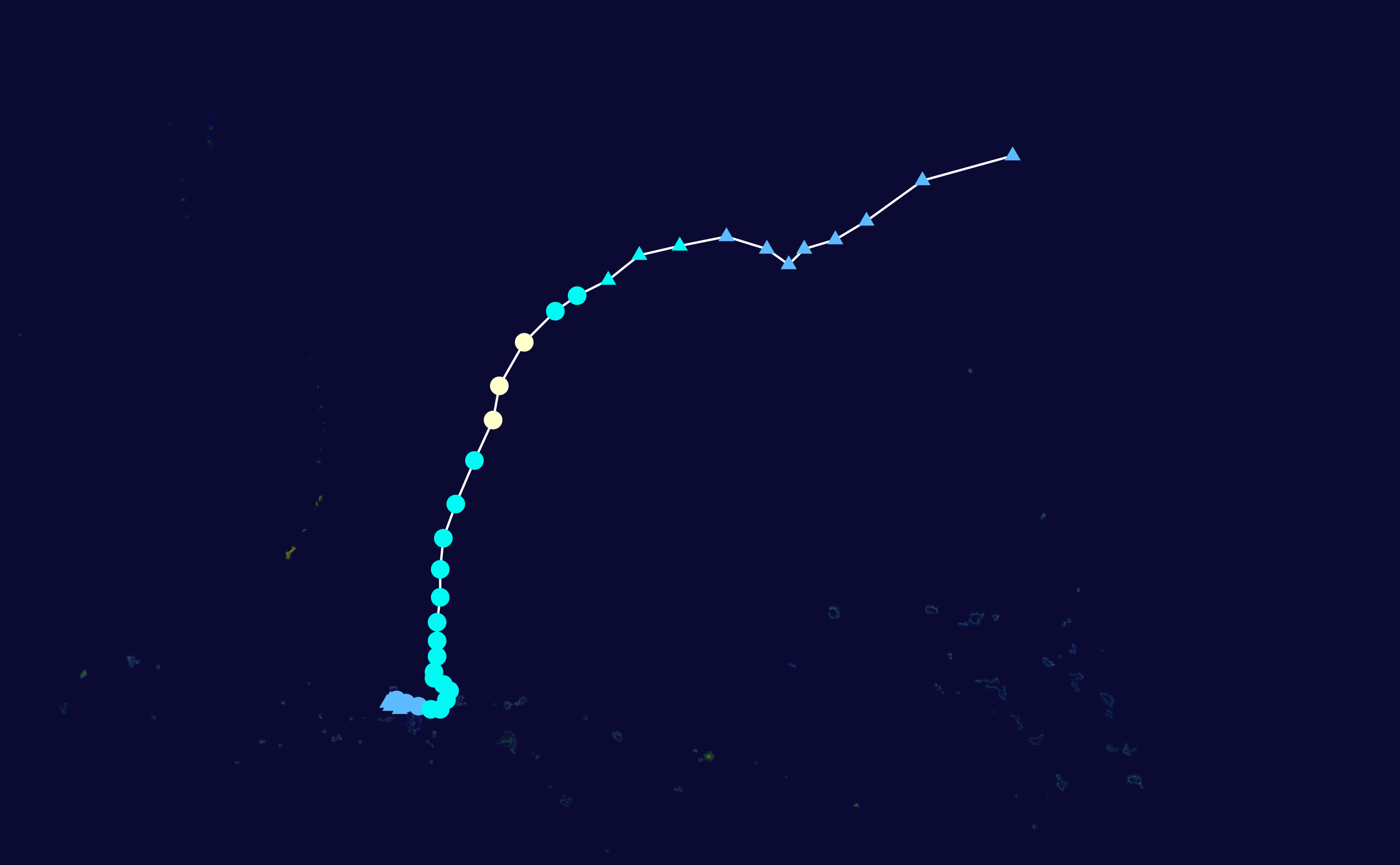
- Duration: February 27 – March 5
- Peak intensity: 120 km/h (75 mph) (10-min); 975 hPa (mbar)

On February 27, the JMA started to monitor a tropical disturbance, that had developed, about 630 km (390 mi) to the south-southeast of Hagåtña, Guam. During the following day, it was upgraded by the JTWC to a tropical depression, and designated as 03W. Several hours later, the JMA upgraded the system to a tropical storm and named it Faxai. Faxai began to rapidly intensify into a severe tropical storm, and then typhoon, for a short period of time on March 4. The system transitioned into an extratropical cyclone during March 6, before it dissipated during March 8, while located around 800 km (495 mi) to the northeast of Wake Island.

Despite passing well to the east of Guam, Faxai's wind and an enhanced wind flow to the north of the typhoon generated large swells, which claimed the life of a woman.

=== Tropical Depression 04W (Caloy) ===
- Tropical depression (JMA)
- Tropical depression (SSHWS)
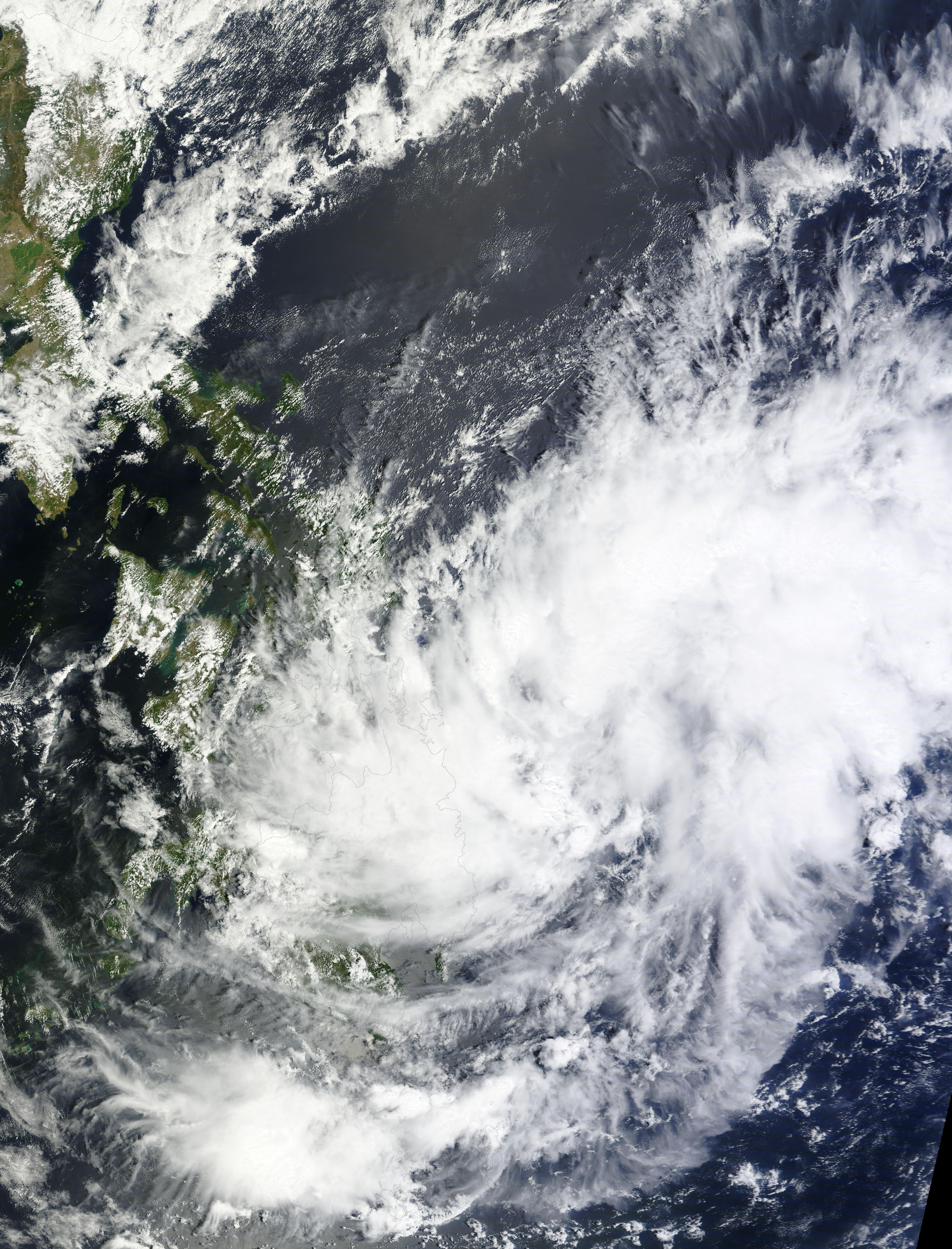
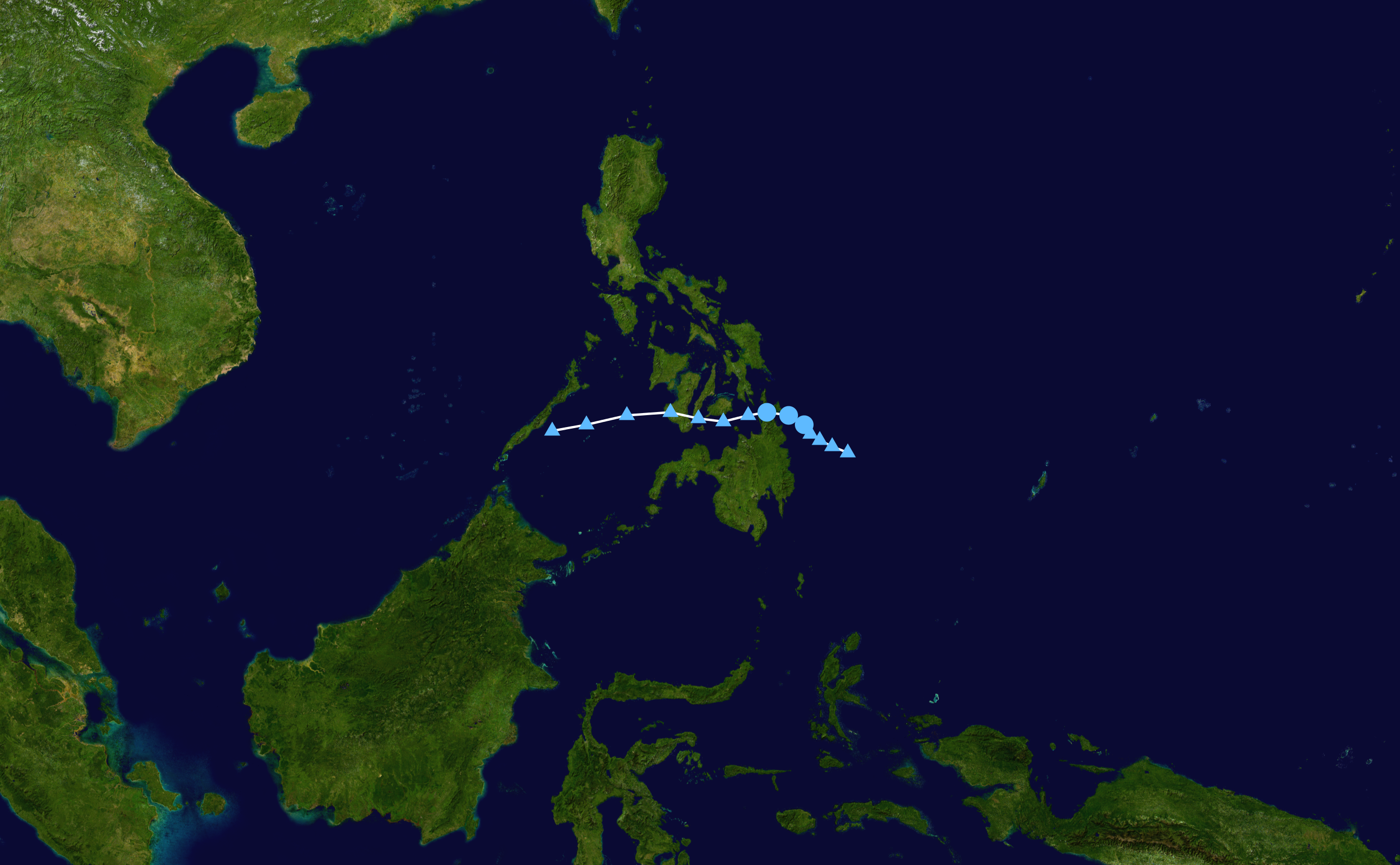
- Duration: March 17 – March 24
- Peak intensity: 55 km/h (35 mph) (10-min); 1004 hPa (mbar)

On March 17, the JMA reported that a tropical depression had developed about 375 mi (605 km) to the east of Melekeok, Palau. Over the next few days, the system became more organised and it was named Caloy by PAGASA on March 21. On March 22, the JTWC started warning on the depression, which had attained winds of 45 kilometres per hour (28 mph), giving the designation of 04W. Caloy made landfall on Mindanao shortly thereafter. The JTWC issued its final warning as the system started to deteriorate later that same day. Caloy dissipated on March 24 as it emerged in the Sulu Sea.

=== Tropical Storm Peipah (Domeng) ===
- Tropical storm (JMA)
- Tropical storm (SSHWS)
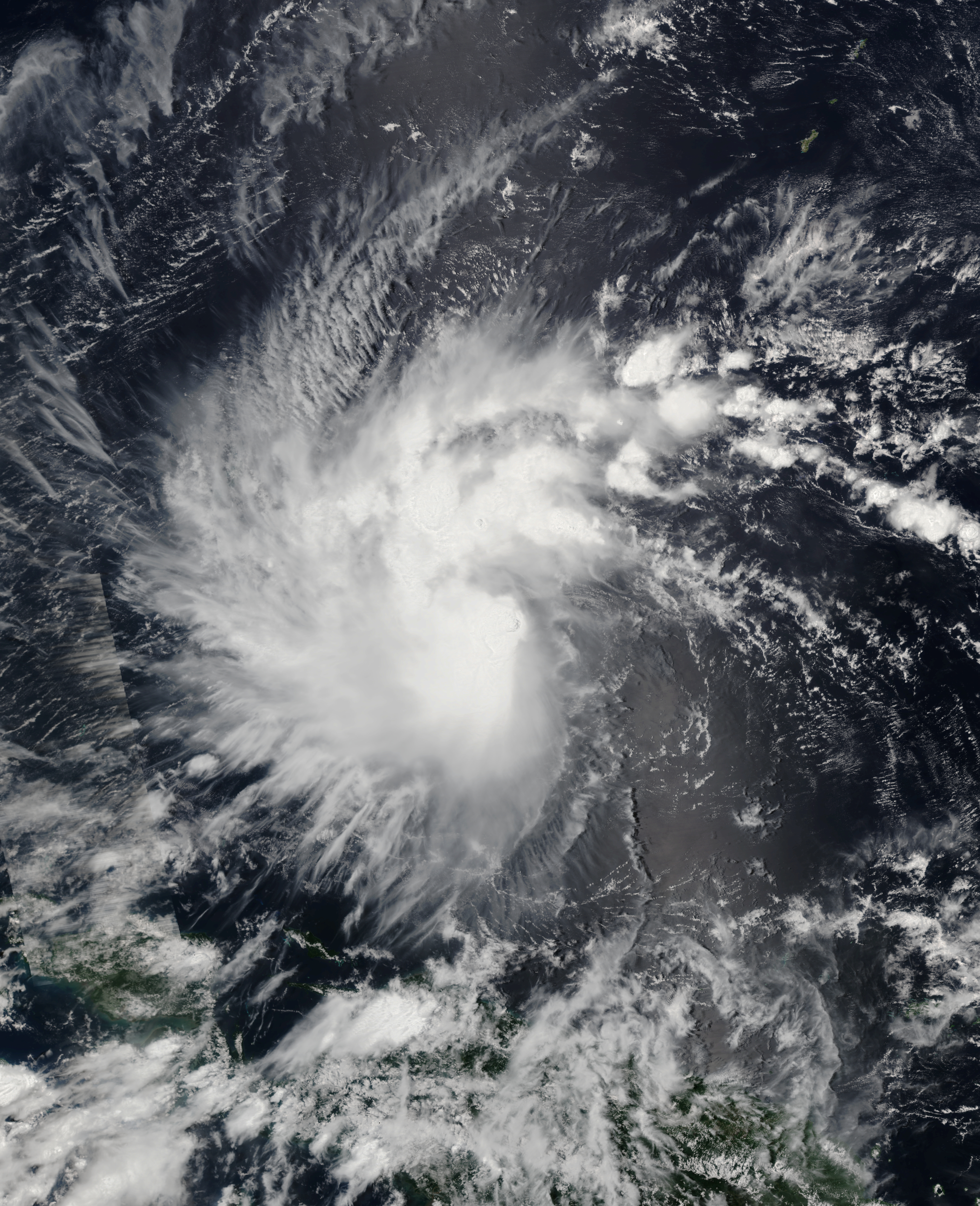
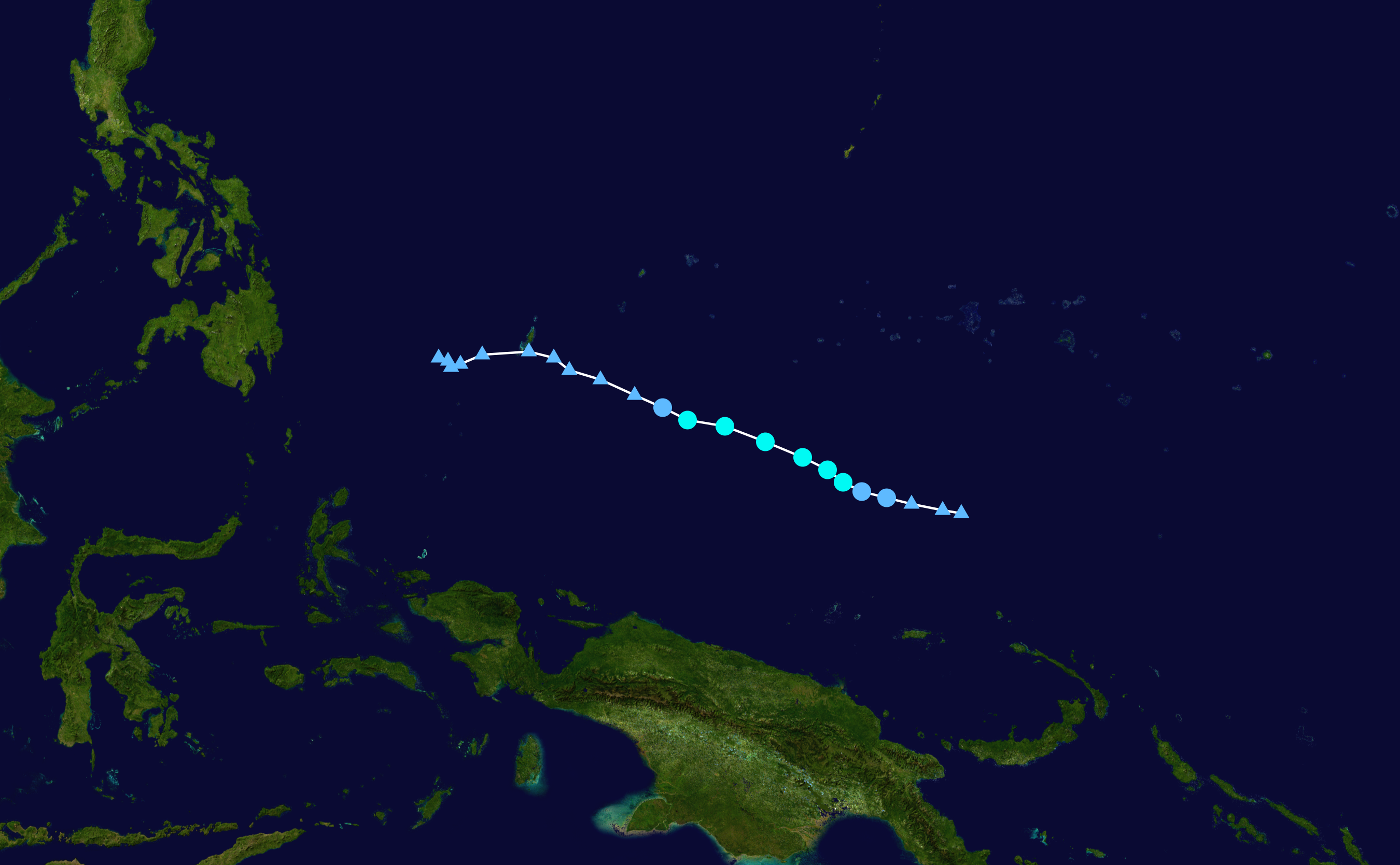
- Duration: April 2 – April 15
- Peak intensity: 65 km/h (40 mph) (10-min); 998 hPa (mbar)

On March 30, a cluster of thunderstorms formed near the equator and Papua New Guinea, where the large cluster separated into two systems, with the other strengthening into Cyclone Ita. It intensified into a tropical depression on April 2 and strengthened into 05W by the JTWC the next day. On April 4, convection built up and the system intensified into a tropical storm, prompting the JMA to name it Peipah. Though during the next day, both agencies downgraded Peipah to a tropical depression, where the JTWC issued its final advisory. By April 6, the system entered into the Philippine Area of Responsibility, and was named Domeng by PAGASA, however they also issued their final advisory few hours later. The JMA continued to track the system until April 8 as it was located over eastern Philippines and had weakened into a low-pressure area.

Late on April 13, the remnants of Peipah regenerated into a tropical depression to the east of the Philippines, while slowly continuing to approach the island nation. On April 15, the depression became disorganized and the system's convection was displaced from its center of circulation, prompting the JTWC to issue its final advisory on the system. During the next several hours, the remnants of the depression turned towards the southwest, until it dissipated late on April 15, just off the northeastern coast of the island of Mindanao.

=== Severe Tropical Storm Tapah ===
- Severe tropical storm (JMA)
- Category 1 typhoon (SSHWS)
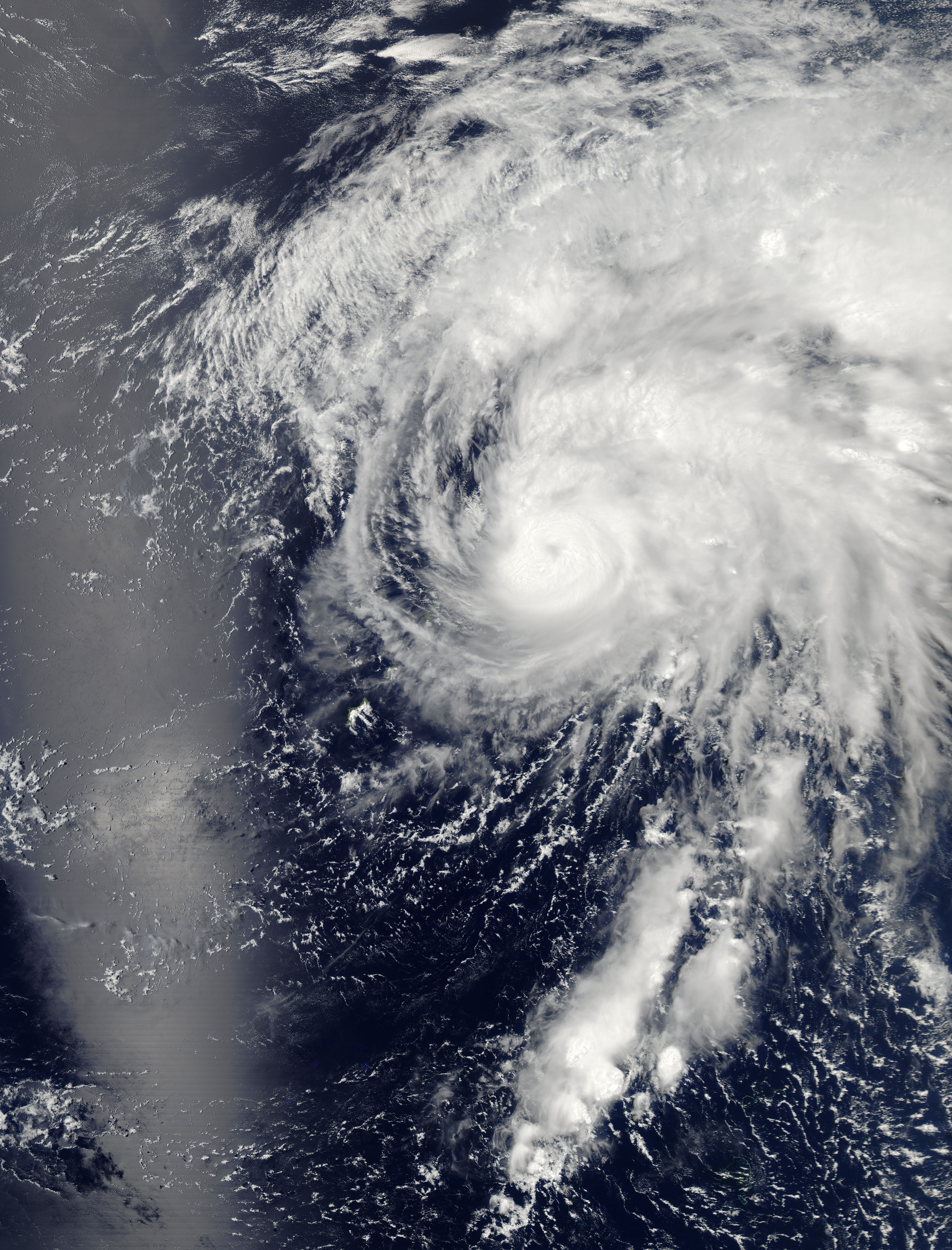
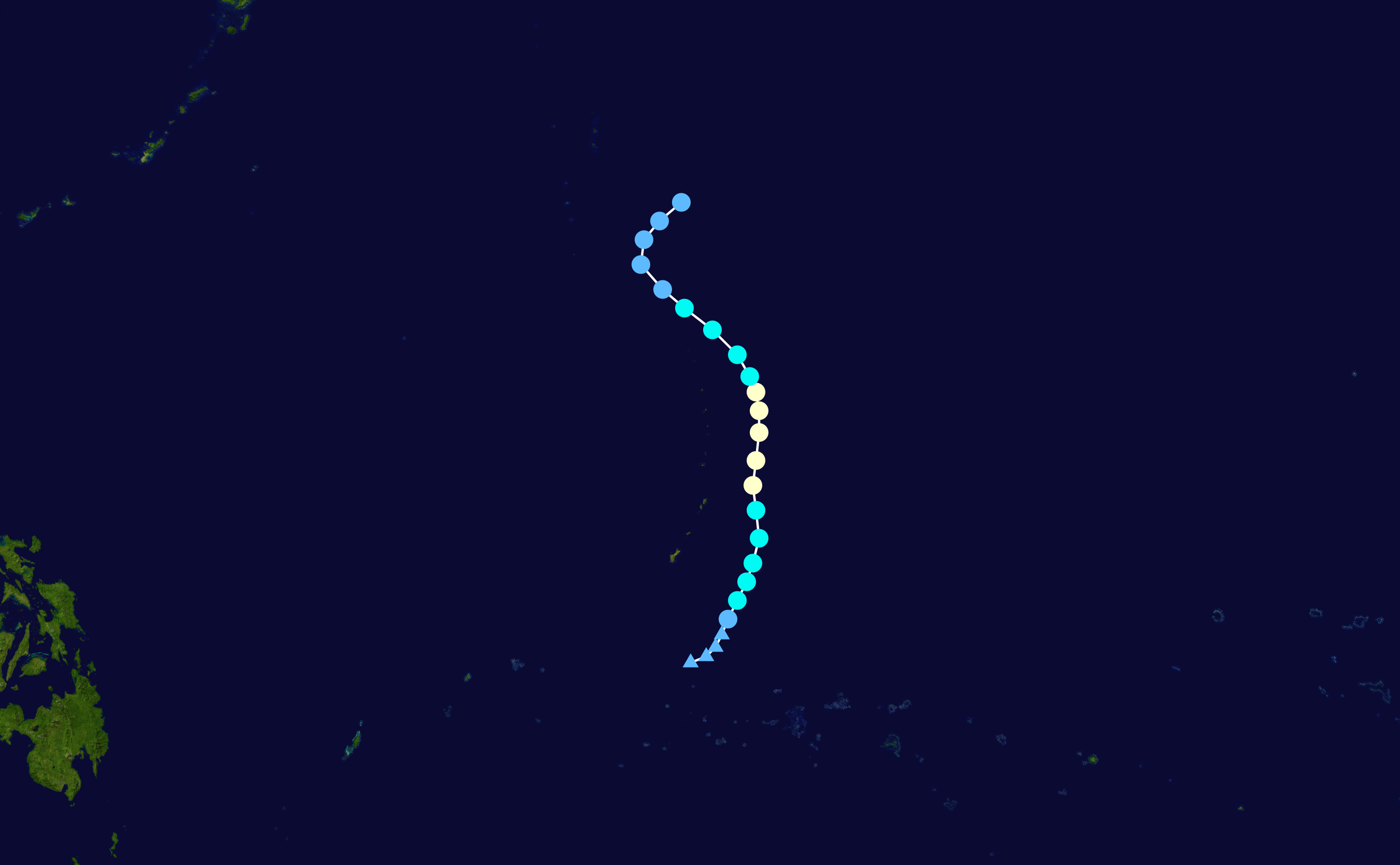
- Duration: April 27 – May 2
- Peak intensity: 95 km/h (60 mph) (10-min); 985 hPa (mbar)

Early on April 27, the JMA reported that a tropical depression had formed about 420 km (260 mi) to the south-southeast of Hagåtña, Guam. Later that day, the JTWC upgraded it to Tropical Depression 06W as it moved north. Due to warm waters, the system rapidly intensified into a tropical storm with the JMA naming it Tapah on April 28. Later that day, convection occurred and the system was upgraded to a severe tropical storm. Early on April 29, the JTWC upgraded Tapah into a minimal typhoon. It weakened back to a tropical storm during April 30. During May 1, the system weakened into a tropical depression because of the effects of strong vertical windshear and a decrease in sea surface temperatures, before the JTWC issued their final advisory on the system. The system was subsequently last noted by the JMA during the next day, as it dissipated over 1,300 km (810 mi) to the south-east of Tokyo, Japan.

=== Tropical Storm Mitag (Ester) ===
- Tropical storm (JMA)
- Subtropical storm (SSHWS)
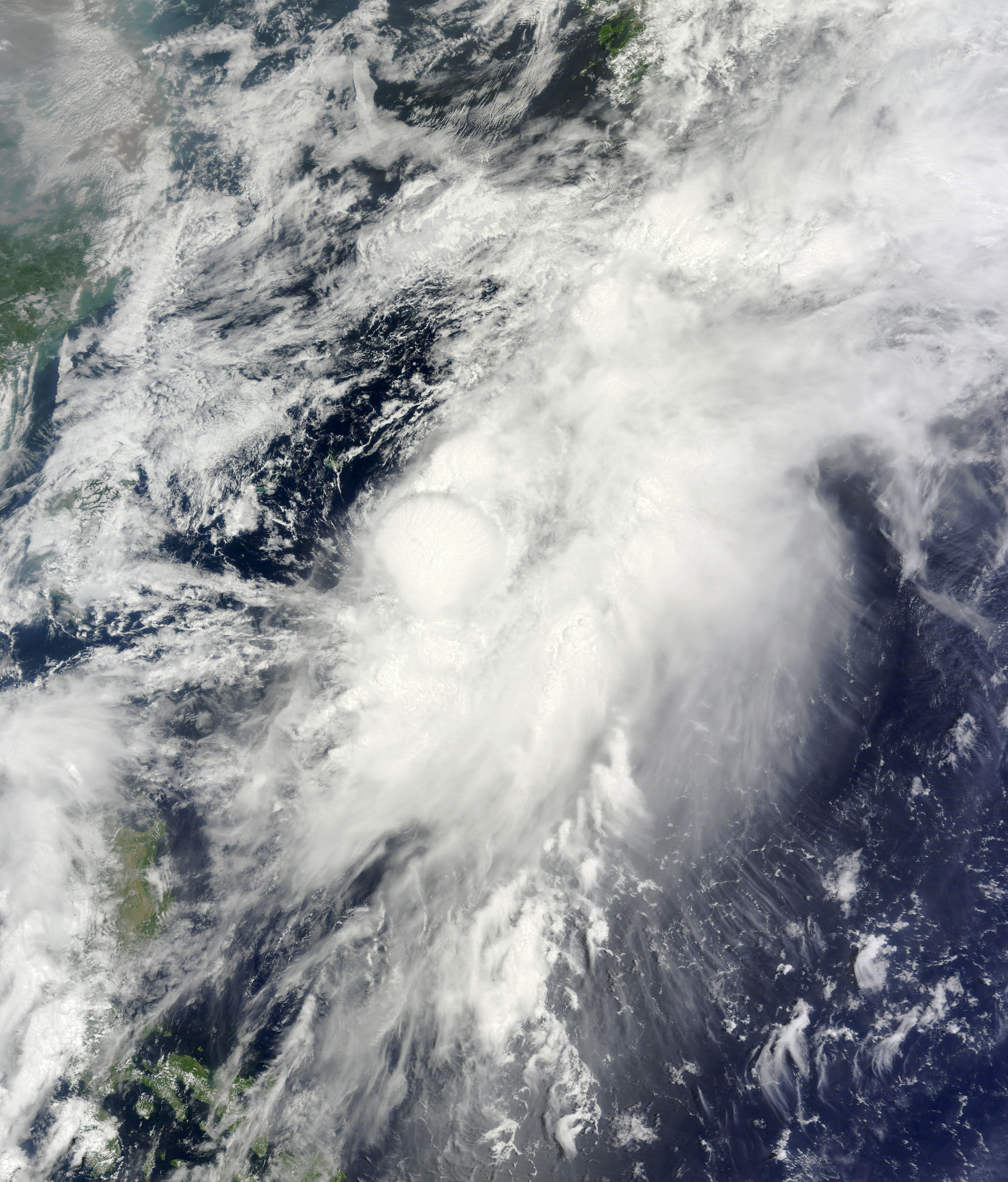
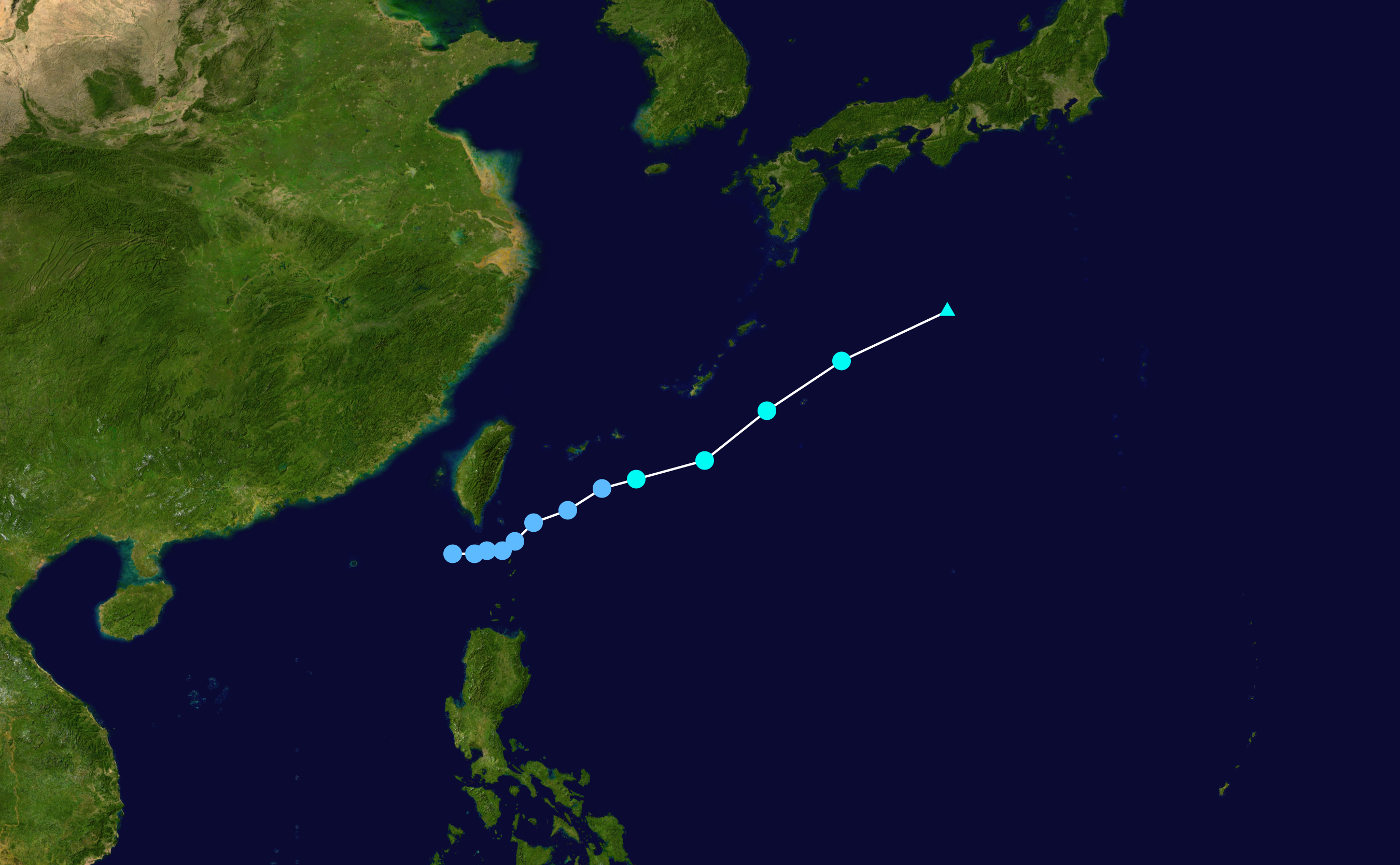
- Duration: June 9 – June 12
- Peak intensity: 75 km/h (45 mph) (10-min); 994 hPa (mbar)

On June 9, the JMA reported that a tropical depression had developed about 115 km (71 mi) to the south-southeast of Hengchun, Taiwan. During the net day, PAGASA named the system Ester, as it brought flooding to the Philippines. By June 11, convection increased near the system's center as the JMA upgraded the system to a tropical storm, naming it Mitag. The JTWC did not track the storm, however in their advisory, they have classified Mitag as "subtropical". Mitag peaked with 10-minute sustained winds of 75 kilometres per hour (47 mph) later that day until it was last noted by the JMA early on June 12, as the system was absorbed by a developing extratropical cyclone located north of Japan.

There was no damage reported in association with Tropical Storm Mitag (Ester) in the Philippines, however, it did prompt PAGASA to declare the official start of the rainy season on June 10, 2014.

=== Tropical Storm Hagibis ===
- Tropical storm (JMA)
- Tropical storm (SSHWS)
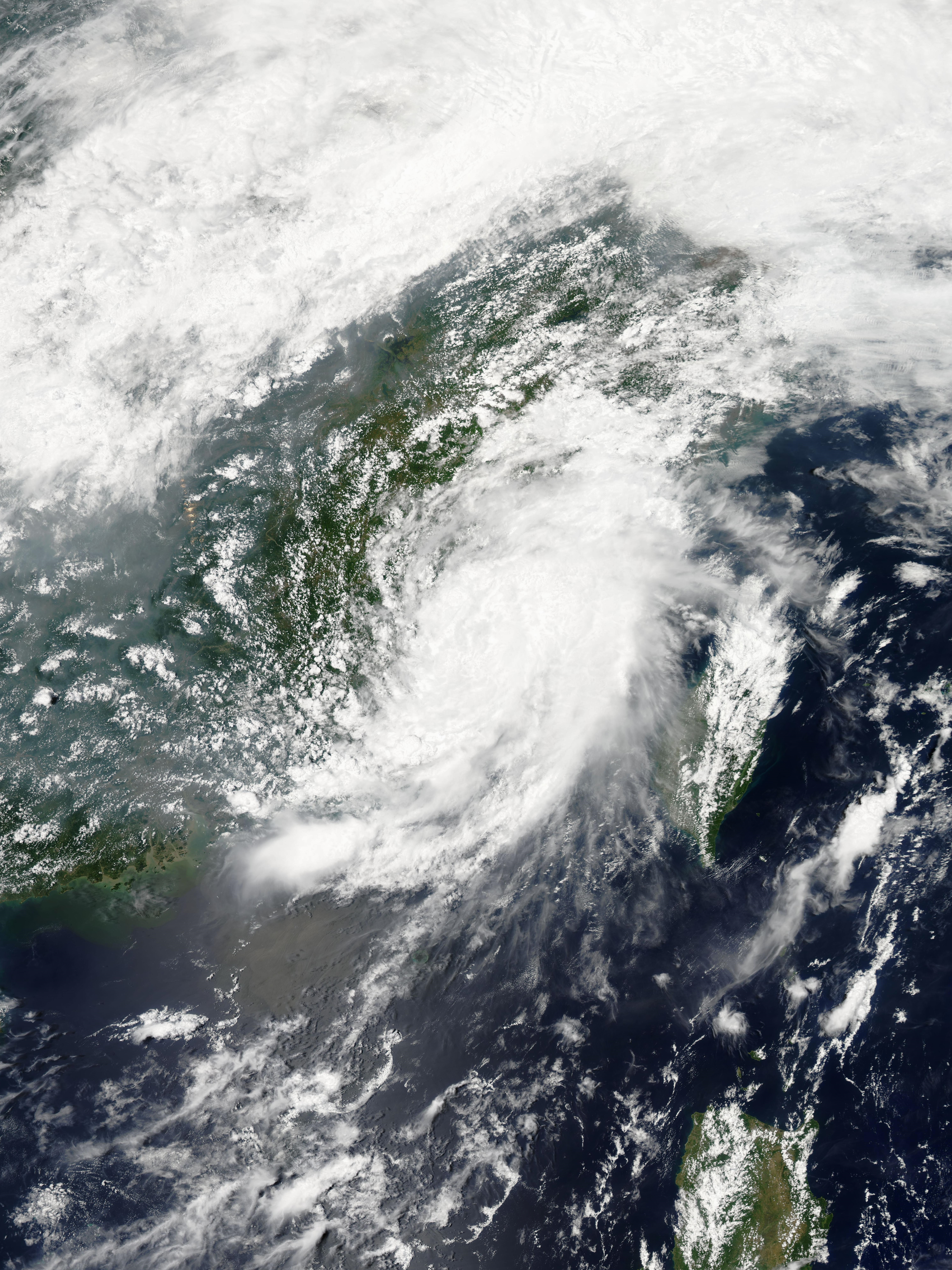
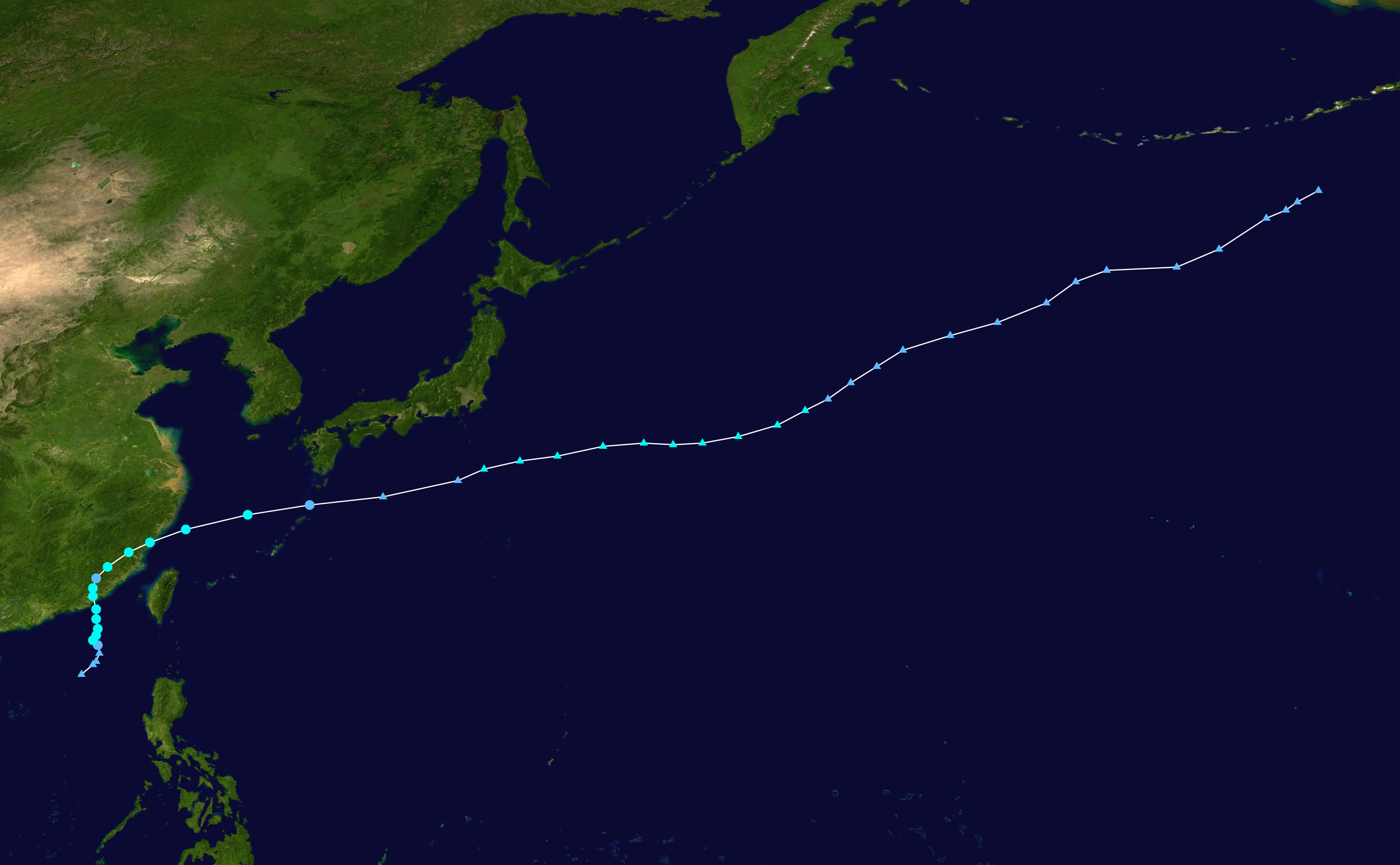
- Duration: June 13 – June 18
- Peak intensity: 75 km/h (45 mph) (10-min); 996 hPa (mbar)

Similar to the formation of Mitag, the JMA started to track a tropical depression over in the South China Sea on June 13. Later that day, the JTWC upgraded the system to Tropical Depression 07W, and at the same time, the JMA upgraded it to a tropical storm, naming it Hagibis. Early on June 15, Hagibis made landfall over southern China. During the next day, both agencies stopped issuing warnings on the system, as it rapidly weakened to a tropical depression over land. Its remnants still continued to move northward, and on June 17, the remnants of Hagibis curved eastwards, as it re-generated into a tropical storm. As a result, both agencies re-initiated advisories on Hagibis. Late on June 17, Hagibis transitioned into an extratropical cyclone. The system moved out of the basin on June 23. Hagibis made landfall over southern China at 04:50 UTC on June 15. Torrential rain continued to bring flooding until June 22, as the southwest monsoon weakened. No people were killed, and total economic losses in Mainland China were counted to be CNY 1.23 billion (US$198 million).

=== Typhoon Neoguri (Florita) ===
- Very strong typhoon (JMA)
- Category 5 super typhoon (SSHWS)
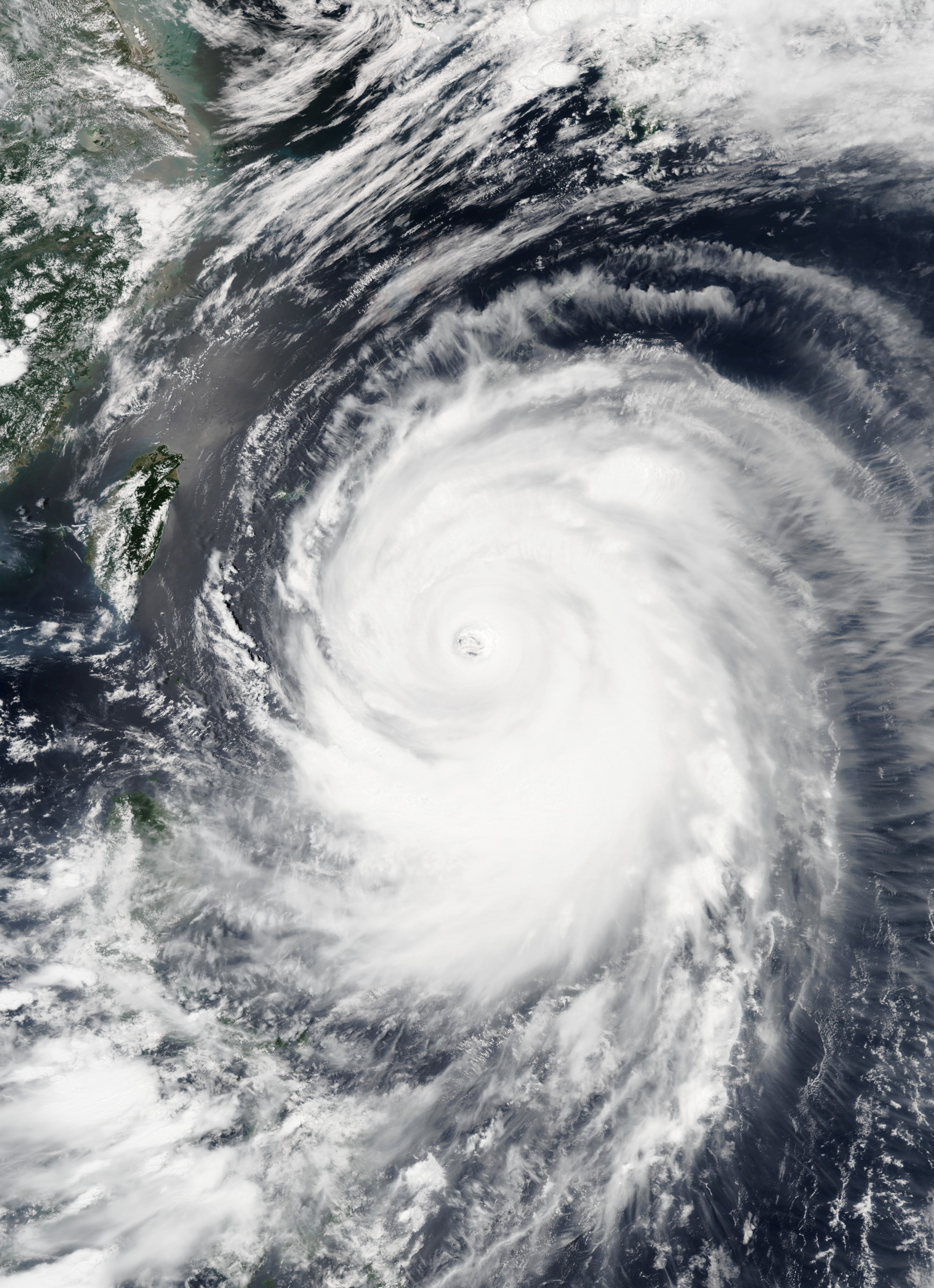
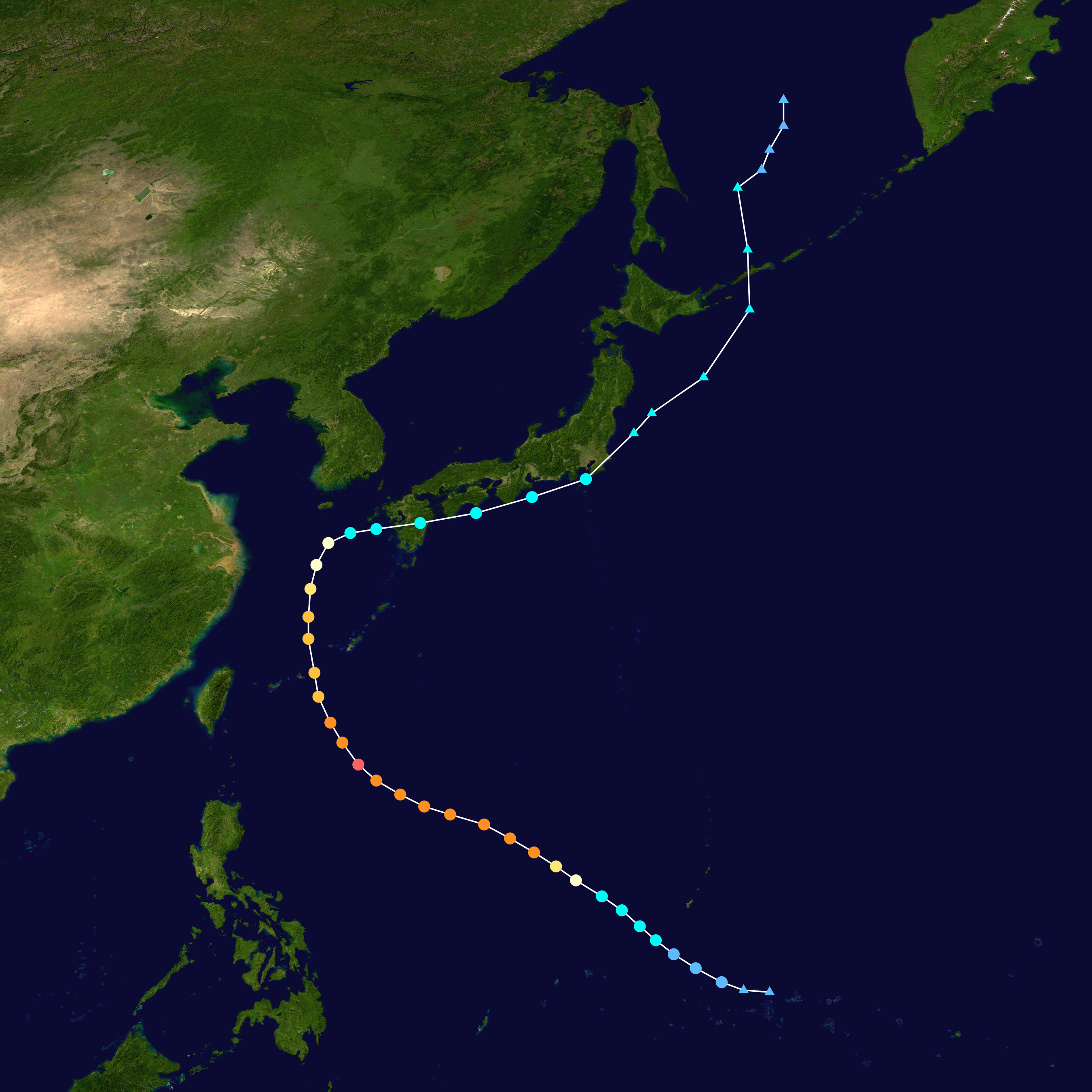
- Duration: July 2 – July 11
- Peak intensity: 185 km/h (115 mph) (10-min); 930 hPa (mbar)

During July 2, the JMA started to track a tropical depression about 220 km (140 mi) east of Chuuk State. The JTWC followed suit early on July 3, with the designation of 08W. Early on July 4, it was upgraded to a tropical storm by both agencies, with the latter naming it as Neoguri. Later that day, Neoguri rapidly intensified into a Category 2 typhoon. By the next day, rapid intensification ensued and was upgraded to Category 4 typhoon status by the JTWC as an eye developed clearly. At the same time, the storm entered the PAR, with PAGASA giving it the local name Florita. Late the next day, Neoguri entered an area of very warm sea temperatures and intensified into a super typhoon. The storm reached peak intensity early on July 7, which the JTWC operationally assessed as 1-minute winds of 250 kilometres per hour (160 mph), with a minimum pressure of 930 hPa by the JMA, though in post-analysis Neoguri reached Category 5 intensity. Early on July 8, Neoguri weakened to a Category 3 typhoon and PAGASA stated that the storm had exited their area later that day. Late the next day, Neoguri further weakened to a severe tropical storm by the JMA. Due to the strong jet stream, Neoguri moved in an eastward direction instead of moving towards Korea. On July 10, JMA downgraded the system to a tropical storm and the JTWC issued its final advisory a few hours later as it started to become extratropical. At the same time, Neoguri's circulation became totally exposed as it was affecting southern Japan. The JMA made their final warning early on July 11, as Neoguri became extratropical. Its extratropical remnants of Neoguri collided with another weak, developing system north of it late on July 13.

Throughout its path, Neoguri only caused three fatalities from Japan. A total of 670,000 people were forced to evacuate and about 40 flights were canceled throughout the country where 580,000 of them in Okinawa Prefecture and 90,000 in Kyushu from the period of July 7–9. Total damage in Japan was standing at ¥64 billion (US$632 million). On July 12, a few days after the typhoon, a heat wave swept across parts of Honshu and Hokkaido, killing one person.

=== Typhoon Rammasun (Glenda) ===
- Very strong typhoon (JMA)
- Category 5 super typhoon (SSHWS)
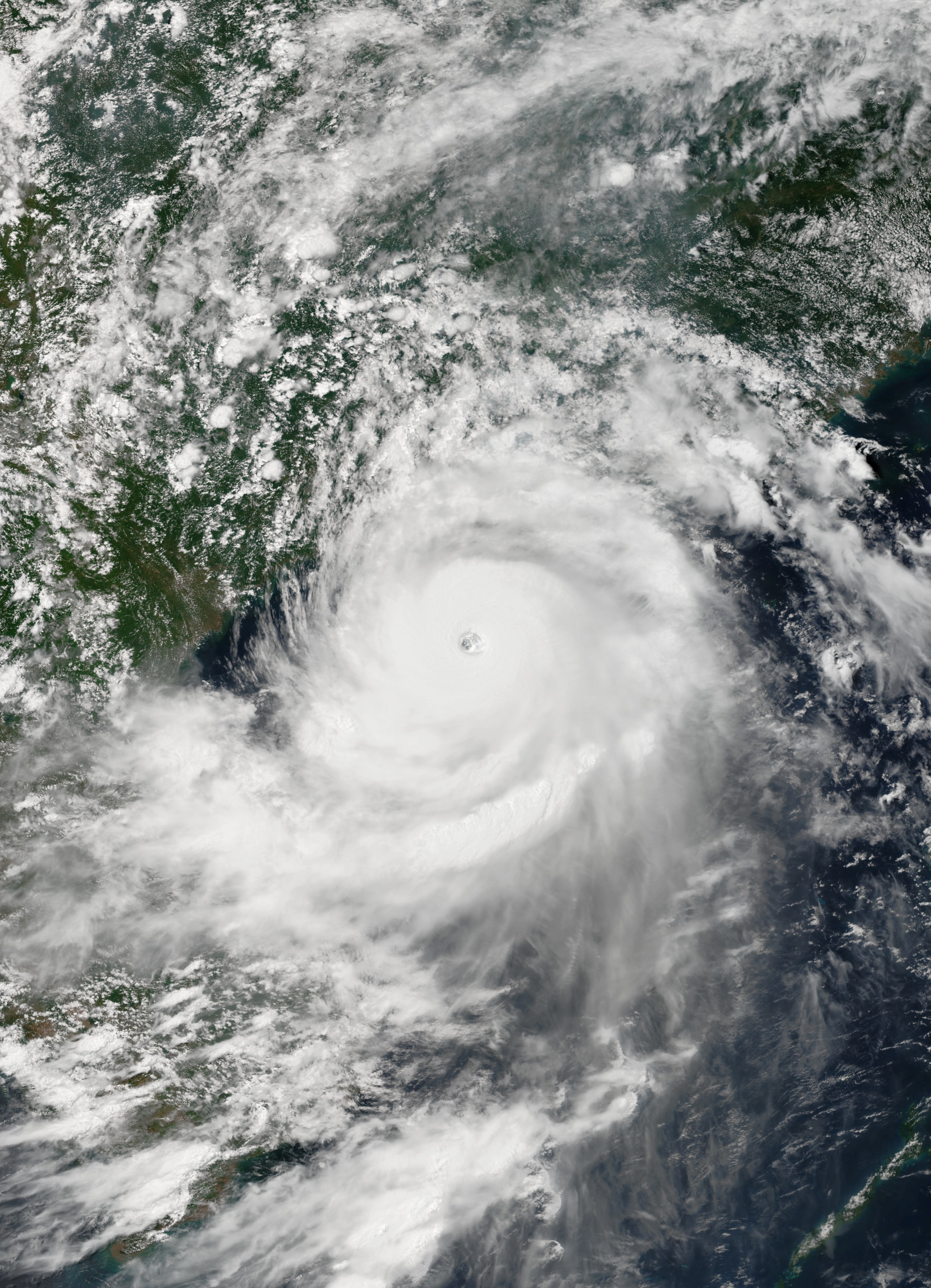
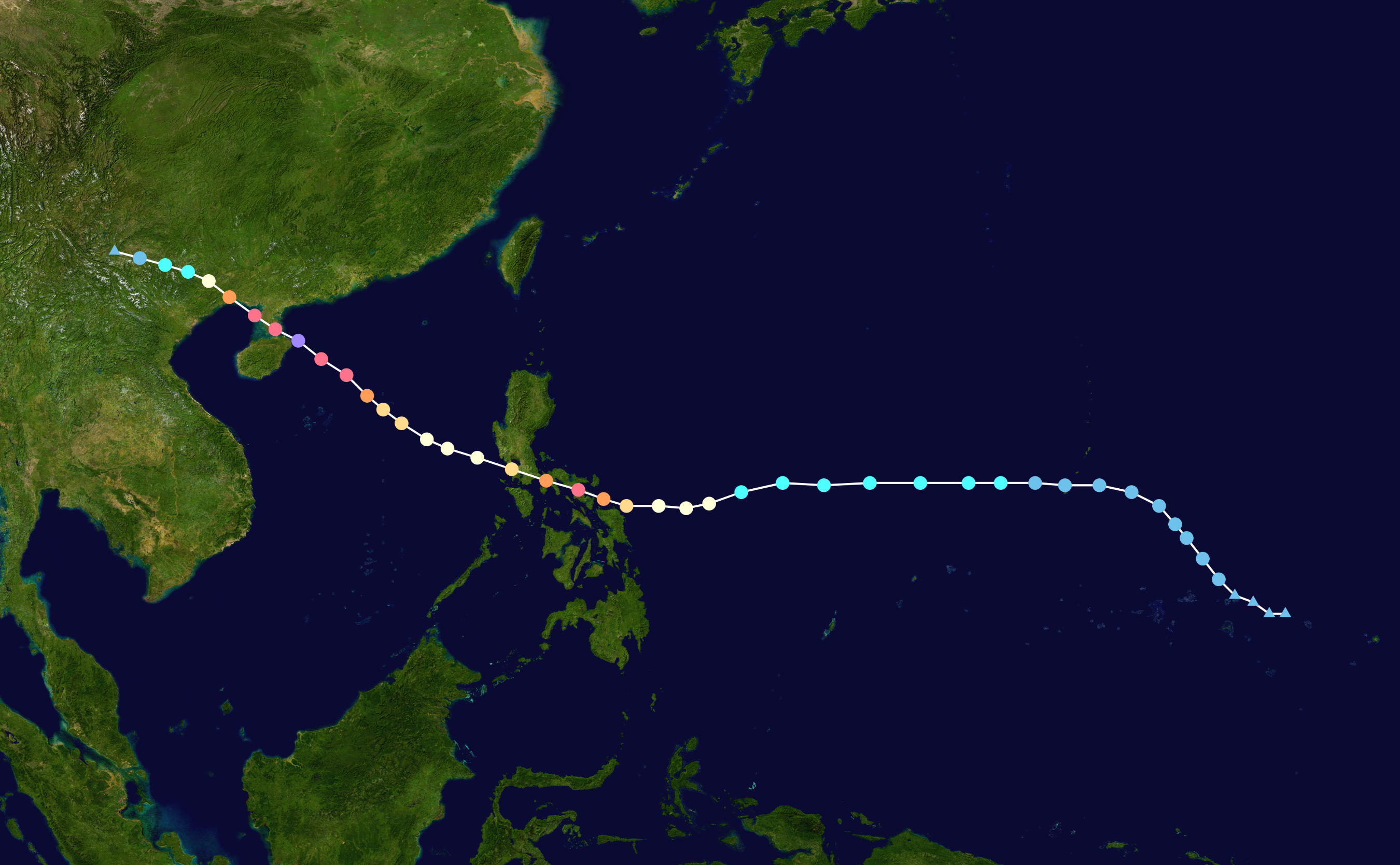
- Duration: July 9 – July 20
- Peak intensity: 165 km/h (105 mph) (10-min); 935 hPa (mbar)

On July 9, the JMA started to track a tropical depression roughly 280 km (170 mi) east of Chuuk State. The JTWC followed suit a few hours later with the designation of 09W. Subsequent convective deepening and enhancement of banding features resulted in the system's classification as a tropical storm on July 12 with the JMA assigning the name of Rammasun. Acquiring a slight southerly component to its track, Rammasun gradually intensified over the following days. Owing to its proximity to the Philippines, PAGASA began monitoring the storm on July 13 and assigned it the local name Glenda. The system achieved typhoon strength on July 14 after a 27 km (17 mi) wide eye formed. Rapid intensification ensued on the next day as Rammasun struck Rapu-Rapu, Albay in the Philippines as a Category 4 typhoon with 1-minute winds of 215 kilometres per hour (134 mph).

Turning back to the west-northwest, Rammasun weakened significantly as it traversed the Philippines. The system emerged over the South China Sea on July 16 with its eye no longer visible on satellite imagery. After briefly weakening to a severe tropical storm, favorable environmental conditions allowed for reorganization and Rammasun reached its peak intensity on July 18 as it approached southern China with a minimum pressure of 935 hPa. Featuring a well-defined eye surrounded by deep convection and prominent outflow, the JMA estimated the typhoon's winds at 165 kilometres per hour (103 mph). Similar to Neoguri, operationally, the JTWC considered the system with peak winds equivalent to a high-end of Category 4 typhoon status, though its post-analysis showed that Rammasun briefly intensified into a Category 5. Weakening took place thereafter with the storm clipping Hainan Island and later striking Guangxi Province. Rammasun degraded to a tropical storm after moving ashore and ultimately dissipated on July 20 over Yunnan Province.

As of July 17, it is reported from NDRRMC that the death toll has reached 40 and the total amount of damages were amounted to 1 billion pesos ($27 million USD). In China, 18 persons were killed due to the storm. Total damages amounted to US$8 billion. Rammasun killed over 200 people.

=== Typhoon Matmo (Henry) ===
- Typhoon (JMA)
- Category 2 typhoon (SSHWS)
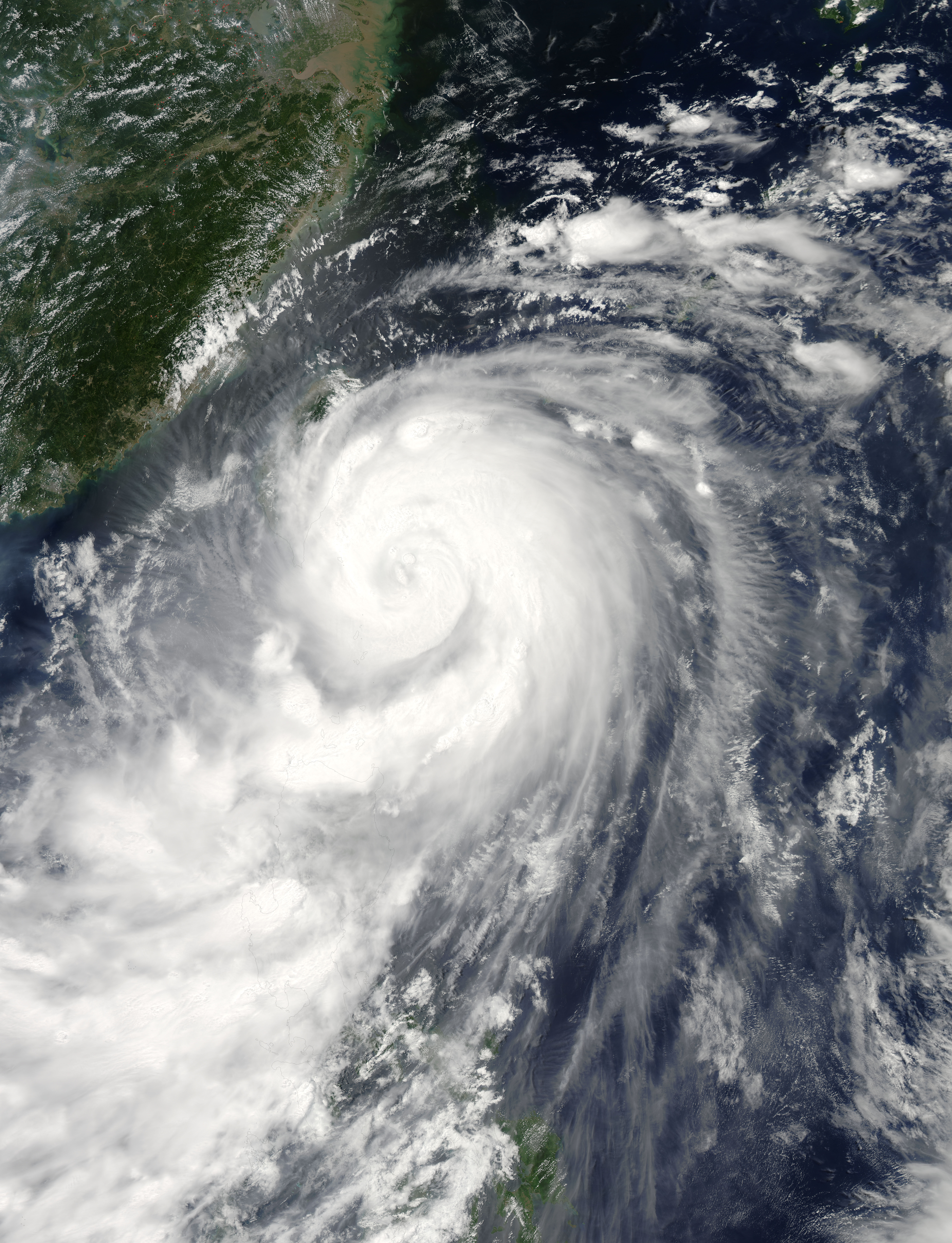
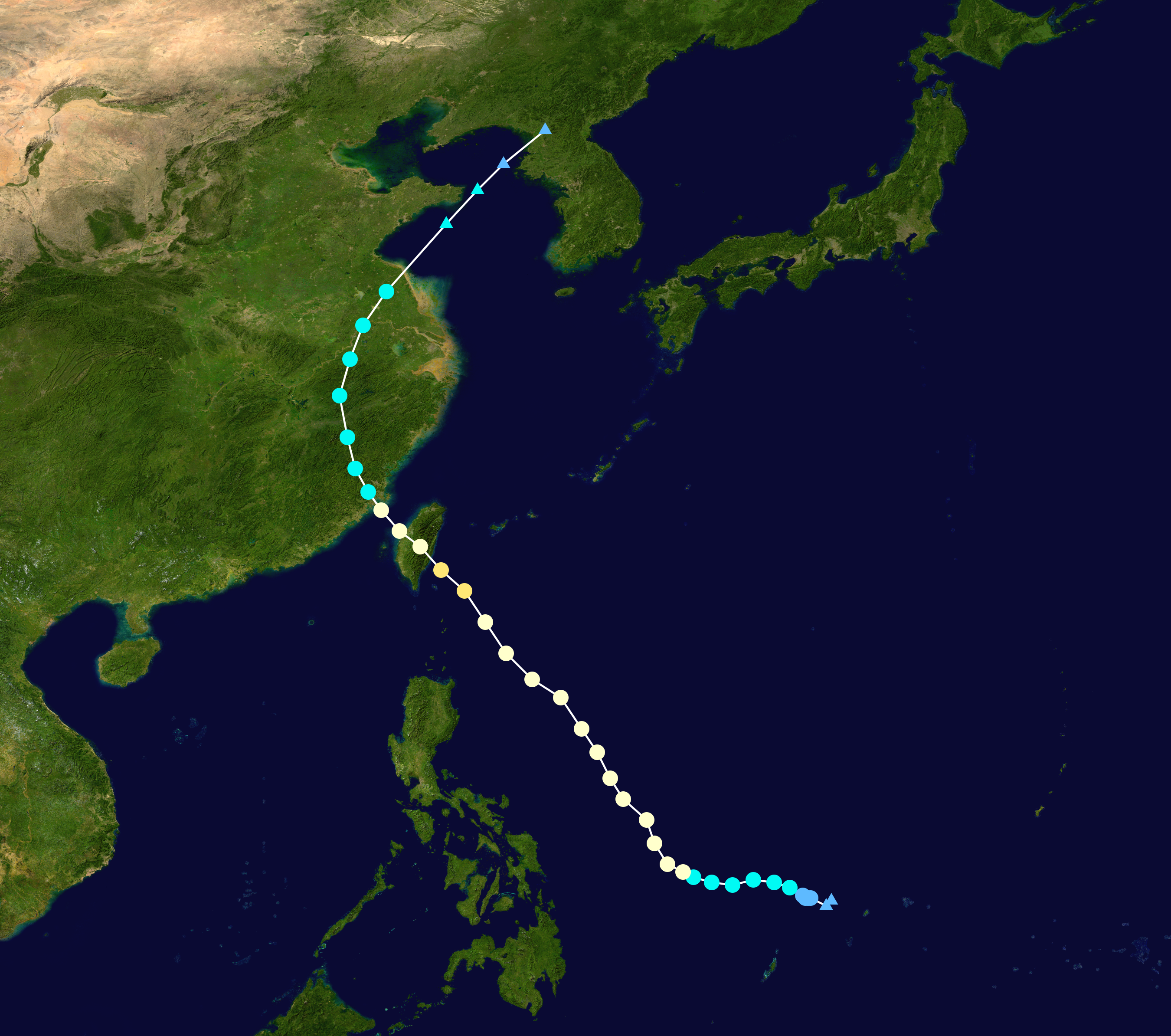
- Duration: July 16 – July 25
- Peak intensity: 130 km/h (80 mph) (10-min); 965 hPa (mbar)

On July 16, the JMA started to monitor a weak tropical depression to the northeast of Palau. The JTWC followed suit early on the next day. At the same day, the depression had intensified into a tropical storm, assigning the name Matmo. Early on July 18, Matmo entered the PAR, with PAGASA giving it the name Henry. By July 19, Matmo further intensified into a severe tropical storm while the JTWC had already considered it as a Category 1 typhoon as it started tracking northwestward. Gradually intensifying, Matmo reached Category 2 typhoon intensity on July 21, and peak early on July 22 with 1-minute sustained winds of 165 kilometres per hour (103 mph). Later that day, the storm made landfall over in Hualien City. Matmo rapidly weakened throughout most of the next day when it made its second landfall in China as a tropical storm; the JTWC issued their final advisory later that day. The JTWC, however, tracked the system until July 25 when it became an extratropical system. Its remnants fully dissipated on July 26 near the Korean Peninsula.

One person was reported dead and there was some damage reported. At least 48 people died in a plane crash in the Taiwan strait; the crash may have been caused by the typhoon. As of July 24, according to the Yilan County Government, the agricultural damage in the county was estimated at about NT$44 million ($1.5 million USD).

=== Typhoon Halong (Jose) ===
- Violent typhoon (JMA)
- Category 5 super typhoon (SSHWS)
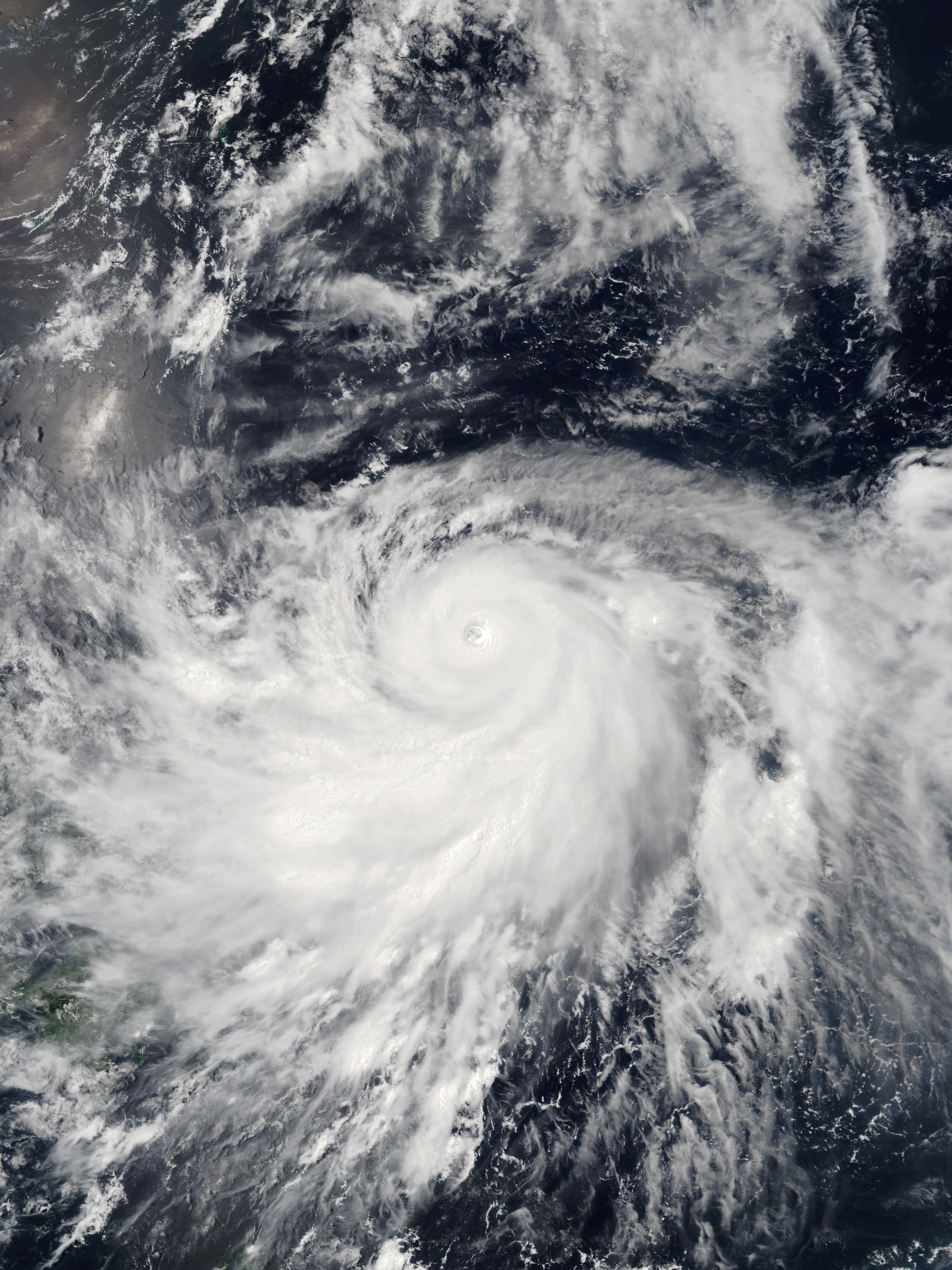
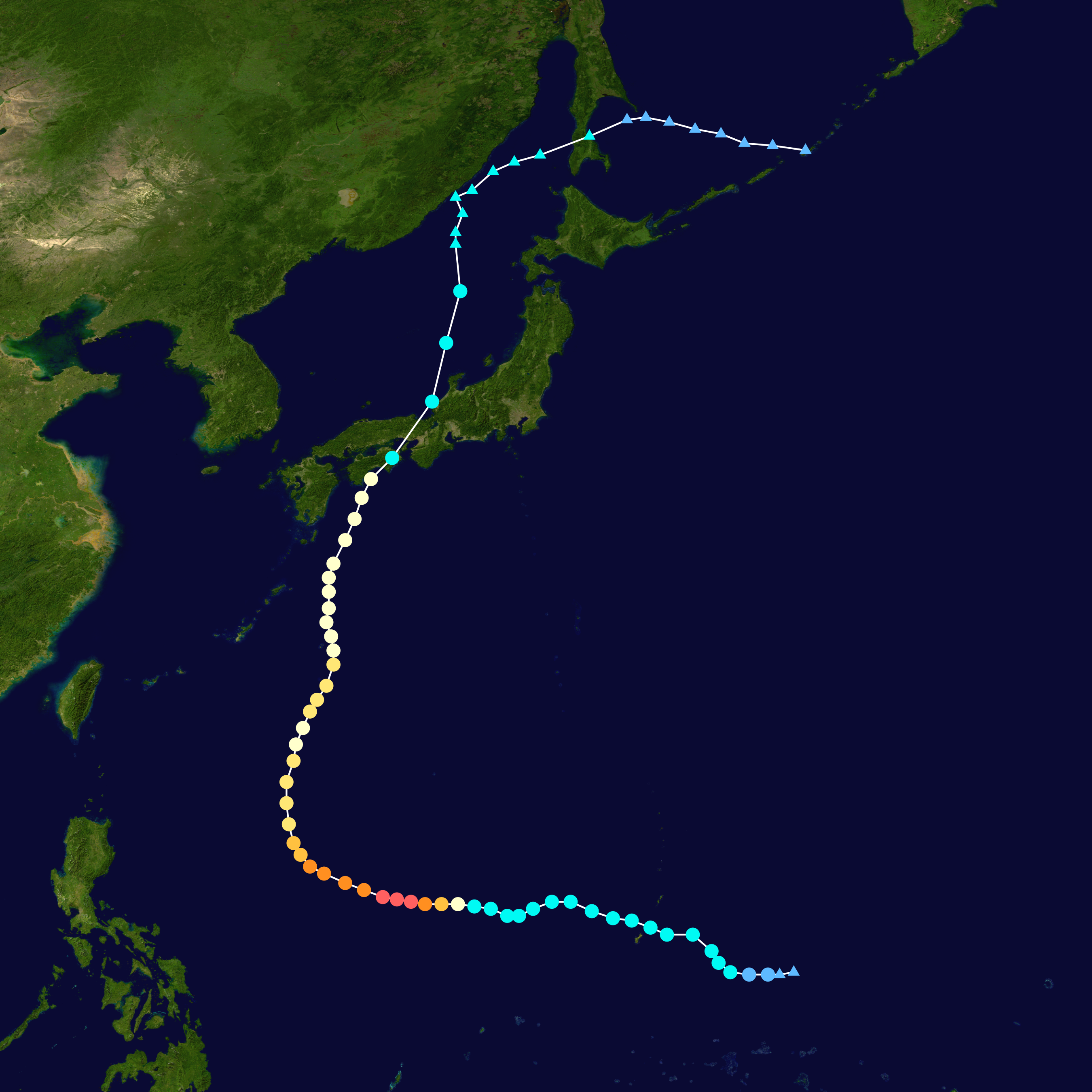
- Duration: July 27 – August 11
- Peak intensity: 195 km/h (120 mph) (10-min); 920 hPa (mbar)

During July 27, the JMA started to track a tropical depression to the southeast of the Mariana Islands. The JTWC followed suit early the next day, giving the designation of 11W. Early on July 29, the system had intensified into Tropical Storm Halong. After two days of steady organization, Halong started to intensify into a severe tropical storm. By August 1, both agencies upgraded the storm to a typhoon. After a period of rapid deepening, Halong developed a clearer eye, and the JTWC further upgraded Halong to a Category 3, then to a Category 5 super typhoon. Halong peaked early on August 3 when it had sustained winds of 195 kilometres per hour (121 mph) and a pressure of 920 hPa. At the same time, PAGASA had reported that Halong had entered their area of responsibility, and assigned the local name Jose. On August 4, Halong underwent an eyewall replacement cycle and consequently, it weakened to a Category 4 typhoon as it curved northwards, and by August 5, Halong was further downgraded to a minimal typhoon. Halong maintained that intensity until made landfall over to the east of Tokyo, Japan on August 9, where the typhoon weakened to a severe tropical storm. By August 10, the JTWC stopped warning on Halong as it was already considered as "extratropical". The JMA tracked the system until early on August 11, though its remnants continued for over the next couple of days where the system had moved westwards into the Sea of Okhotsk, before it was last noted during August 15, as it moved into the Pacific Ocean.

=== Severe Tropical Storm Nakri (Inday) ===
- Severe tropical storm (JMA)
- Tropical storm (SSHWS)
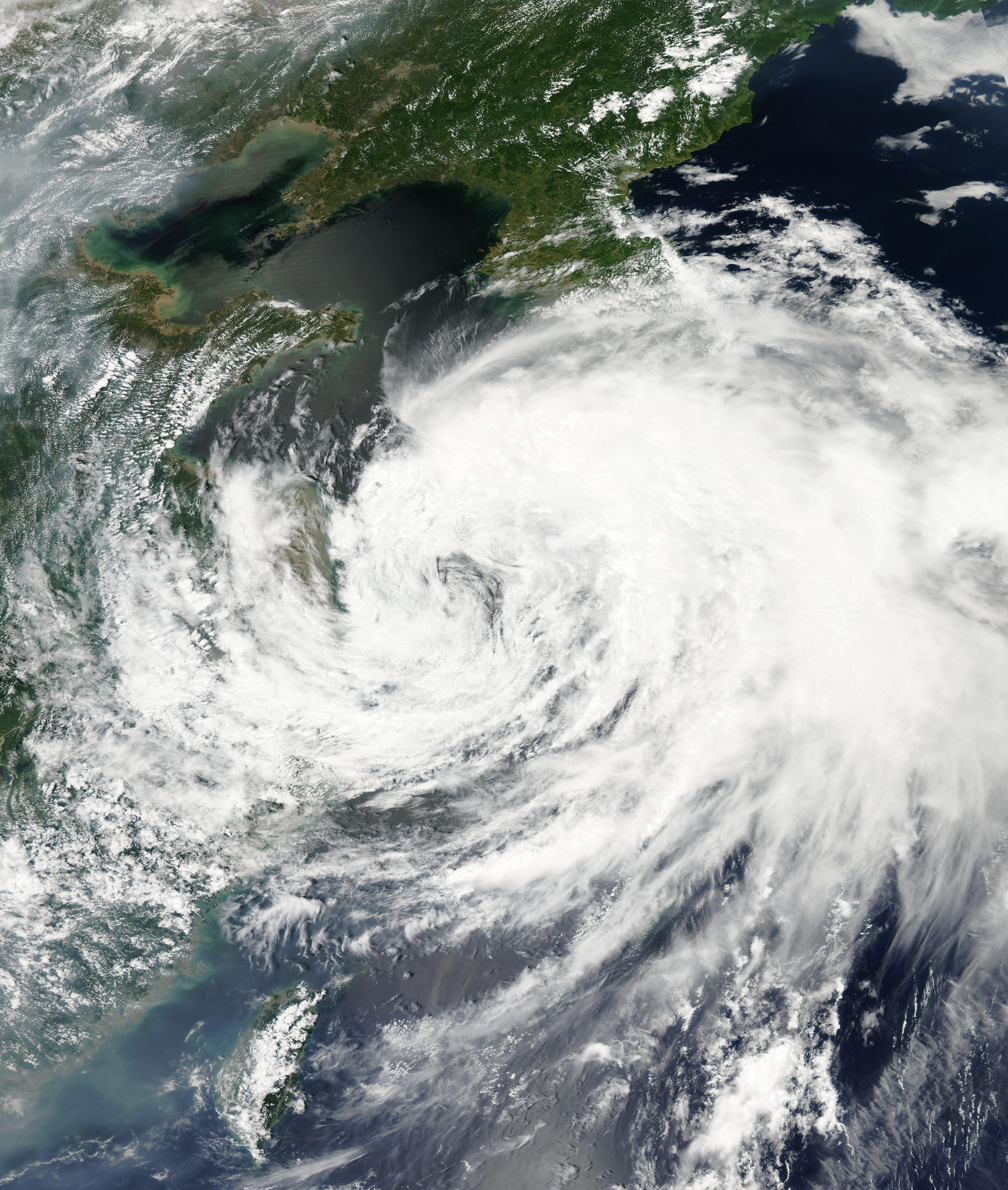
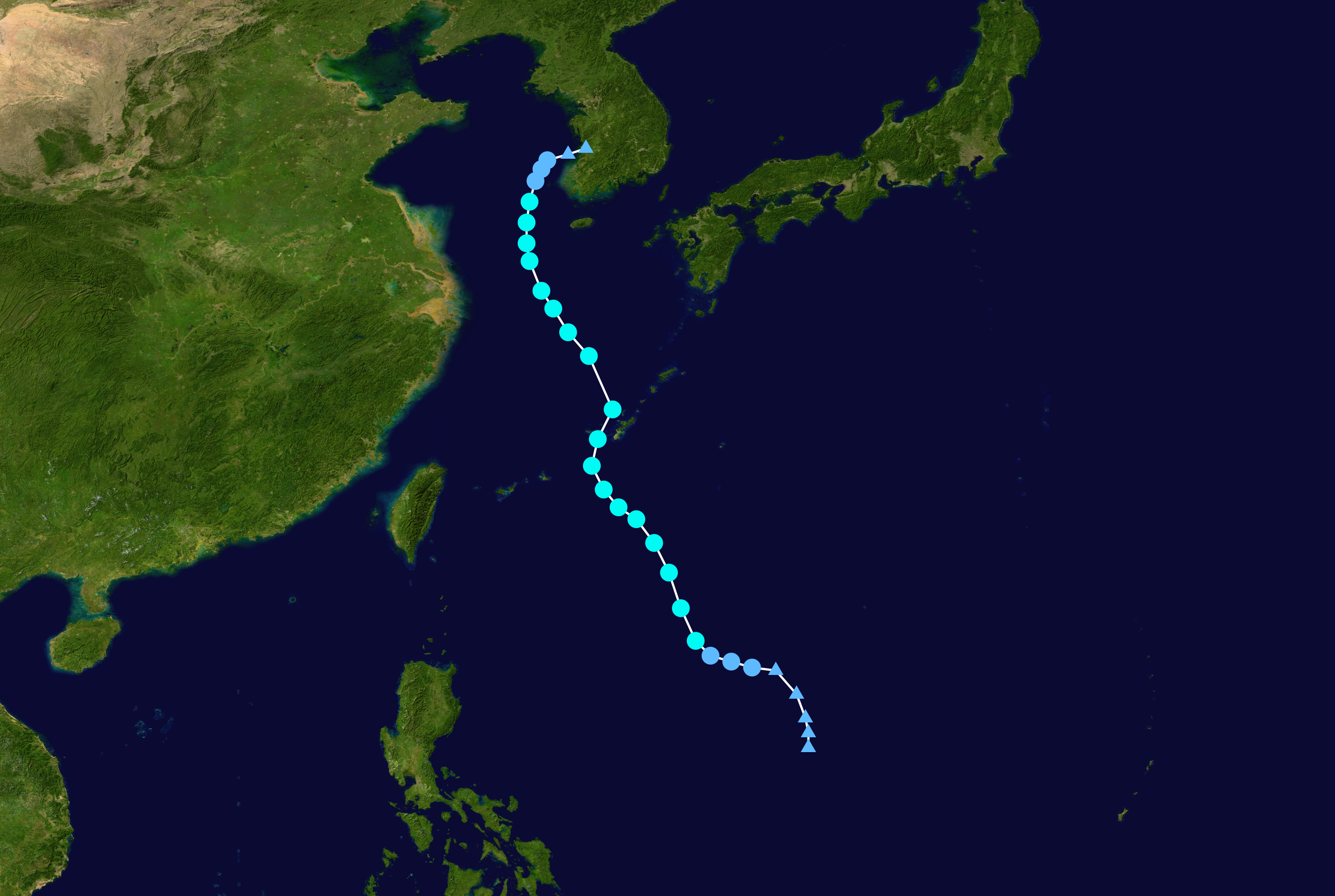
- Duration: July 28 – August 4
- Peak intensity: 100 km/h (65 mph) (10-min); 980 hPa (mbar)

On July 28, the JMA and the PAGASA started to track a tropical depression well east of the Babuyan Islands, with PAGASA naming it as Inday. Gradually intensifying, the JMA upgraded the system to Tropical Storm Nakri the next day. After passing through the Ryukyu Islands, on July 31, Nakri further deepened into a severe tropical storm. The JTWC, although, had only classified this as a "monsoonal disturbance" with winds packing at 40 knots. As Nakri neared the Korean Peninsula, the JTWC had begun warning on the system, although the JMA had already downgraded it to a tropical storm. Six hours later, the JTWC downgraded the system to a depression and stopped warning on Nakri. The JMA continued tracking the system as a tropical depression until it dissipated on August 4.

Despite Nakri did not cause direct impacts on the Philippines, the storm caused damages of Php5.13 million (US$118,000). Over 3,500 hectares of farmland were flooded and uprooted about 130 trees over in South Korea and killed a total of ten people. Damage in Haenam County reached ₩1.573 billion (US$1.52 million). In Japan, Nakri brought flash flooding in many prefectures, especially when the city of Iwakuni broke its record for receiving the most rainfall in 1 hour and 3 hours, with 2.79 inches and 6.14 inches, respectively. The city of Anan also received about 26 inches of rainfall, making it the wettest August since reliable records began in August 1978. Nakri also caused landslides, causing two deaths. An additional one person were killed. Total loss from Nakri, along with Typhoon Halong, were up to ¥89 billion (US$870 million).

=== Typhoon Genevieve ===
- Violent typhoon (JMA)
- Category 5 super typhoon (SSHWS)
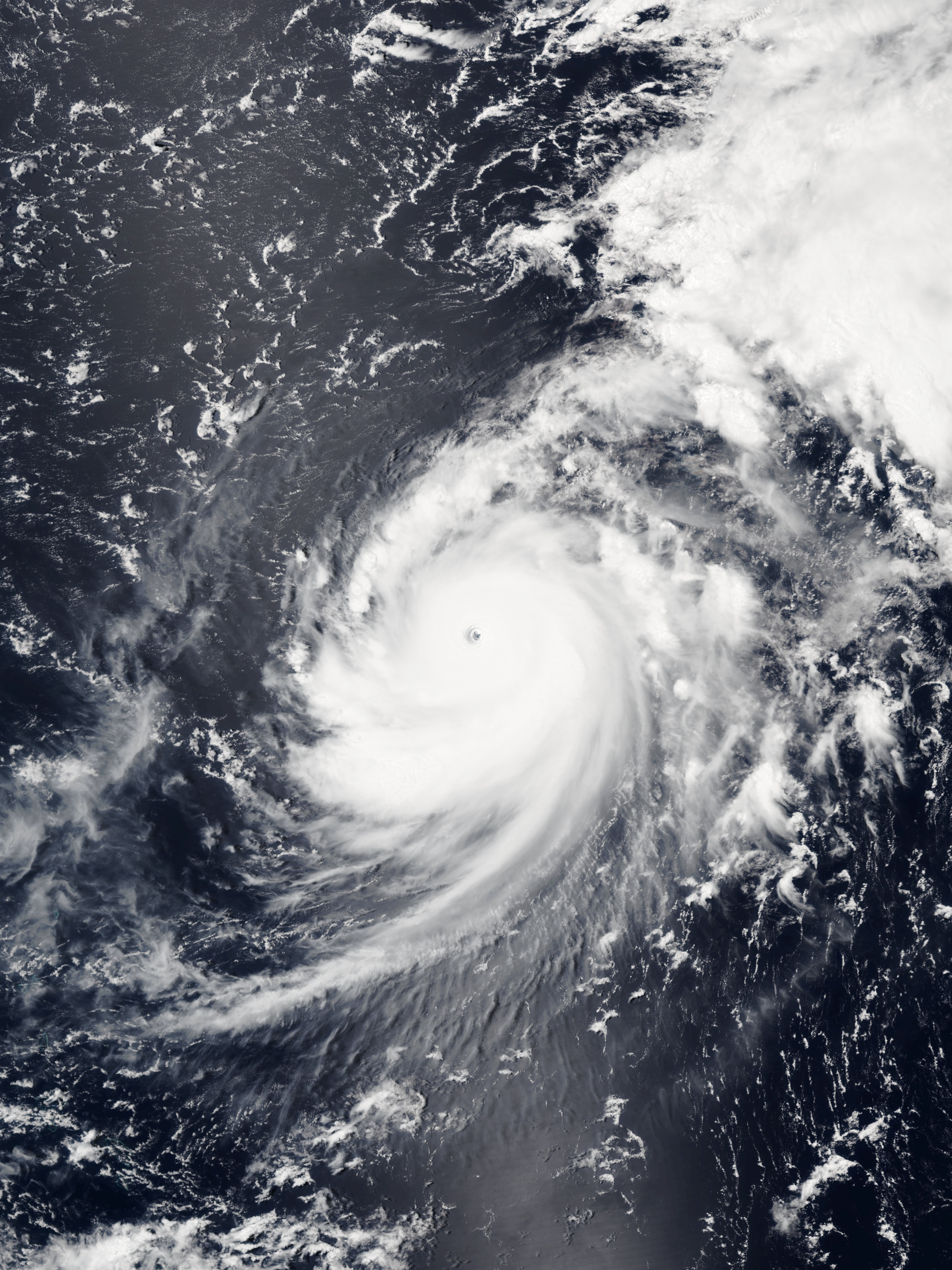
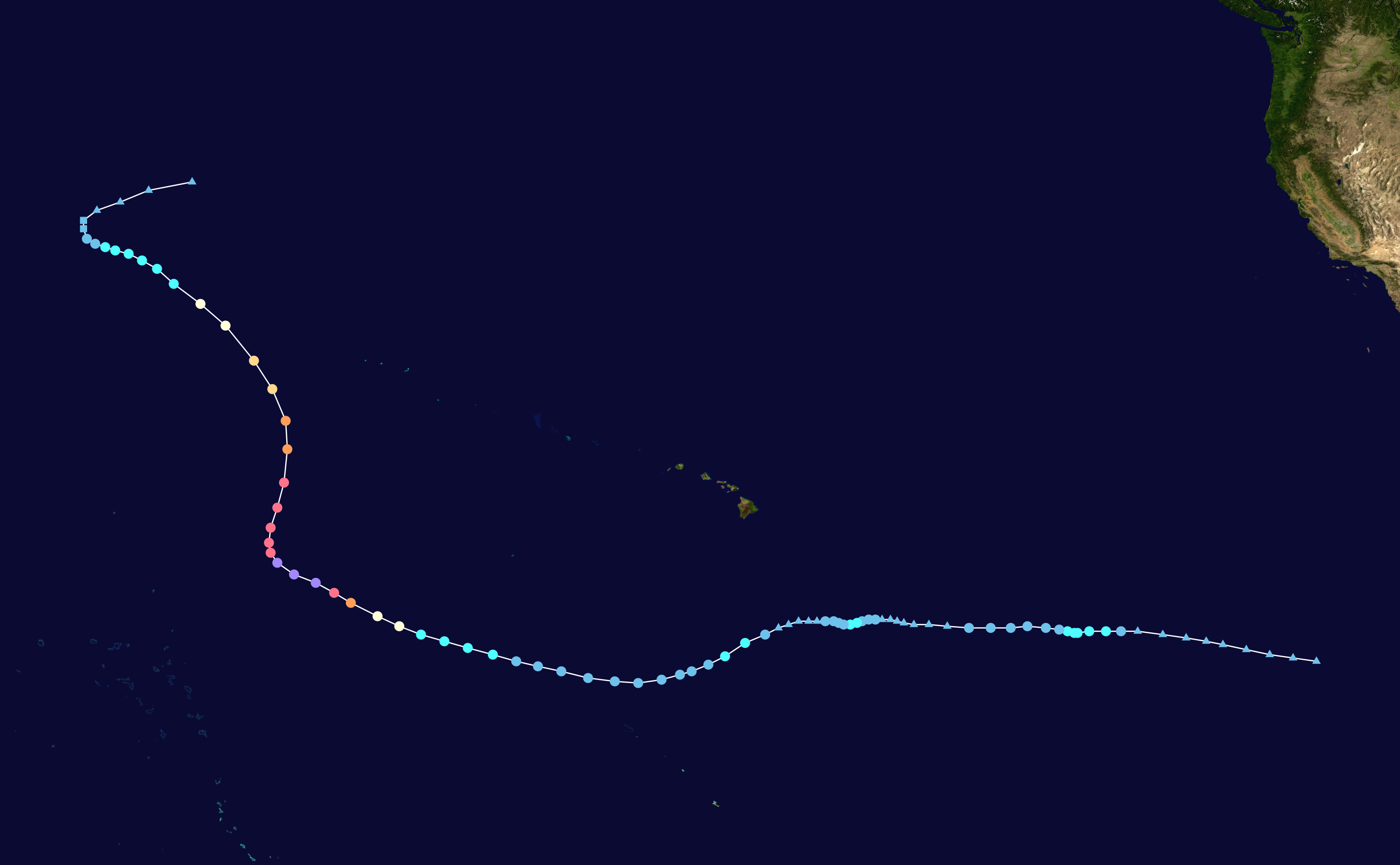
- Duration: August 7 (Entered basin) – August 14
- Peak intensity: 205 km/h (125 mph) (10-min); 915 hPa (mbar)

On August 7, Hurricane Genevieve entered the West Pacific basin at Category 4 super typhoon status. Later that day, the Joint Typhoon Warning Center (JTWC) upgraded the system to a Category 5 super typhoon. Genevieve entered an area of favorable conditions and low vertical windshear, as it continued to intensify. Later on August 7, Genevieve reached its peak intensity, with winds of 110 knots (205 km/h; 125 mph), and with this, it became the third strongest storm within the Northwest Pacific in 2014. On August 9, Genevieve started to move in a northward direction, towards low to moderate vertical windshear. Later that day, the JTWC downgraded the system to a category 3 typhoon. Later that day, Genevieve rapidly weakened to a strong Category 2 typhoon, as it began to encounter increasing windshear and drier inflow, to the south of the system. At the same time, the eye of the typhoon began to shrink. On August 10, Genevieve weakened to a minimal typhoon, as it began to develop a secondary eye, but the secondary eye soon disappeared, due to the storm moving over cooler waters. Both agencies downgraded the system to a severe tropical storm later that day, and rapidly weakening to a minimal tropical storm on August 11. Later that day, Genevieve started to lose its identity, and showed a bit of subtropical characteristics. With this, JTWC issued their final advisory on the storm. However, JMA tracked Genevieve until August 14, as it interacted with a high-pressure area. The remnant energy of Genevieve continued and was absorbed by a developing low-pressure area north of it on August 15.

=== Severe Tropical Storm Fengshen ===
- Severe tropical storm (JMA)
- Category 1 typhoon (SSHWS)
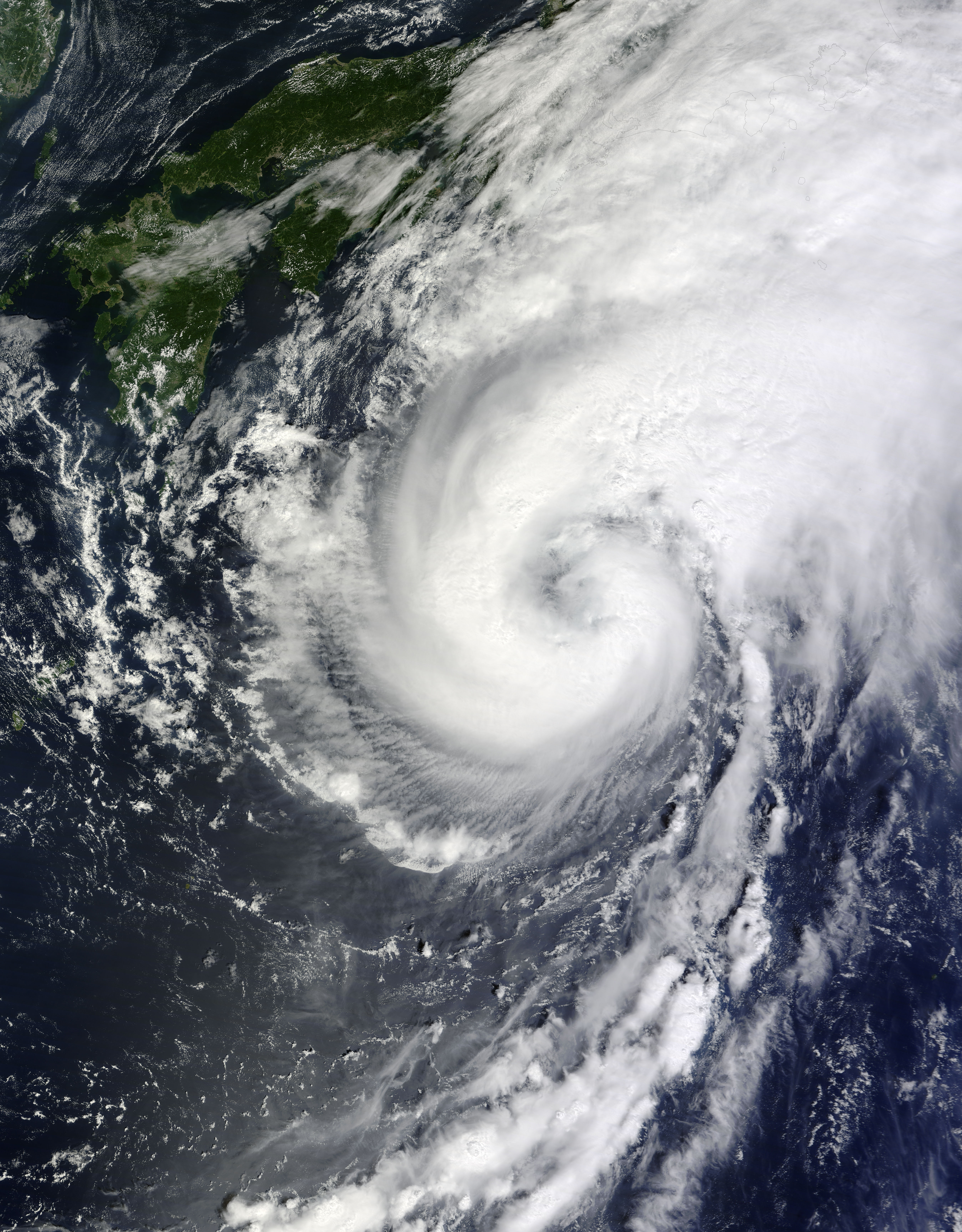
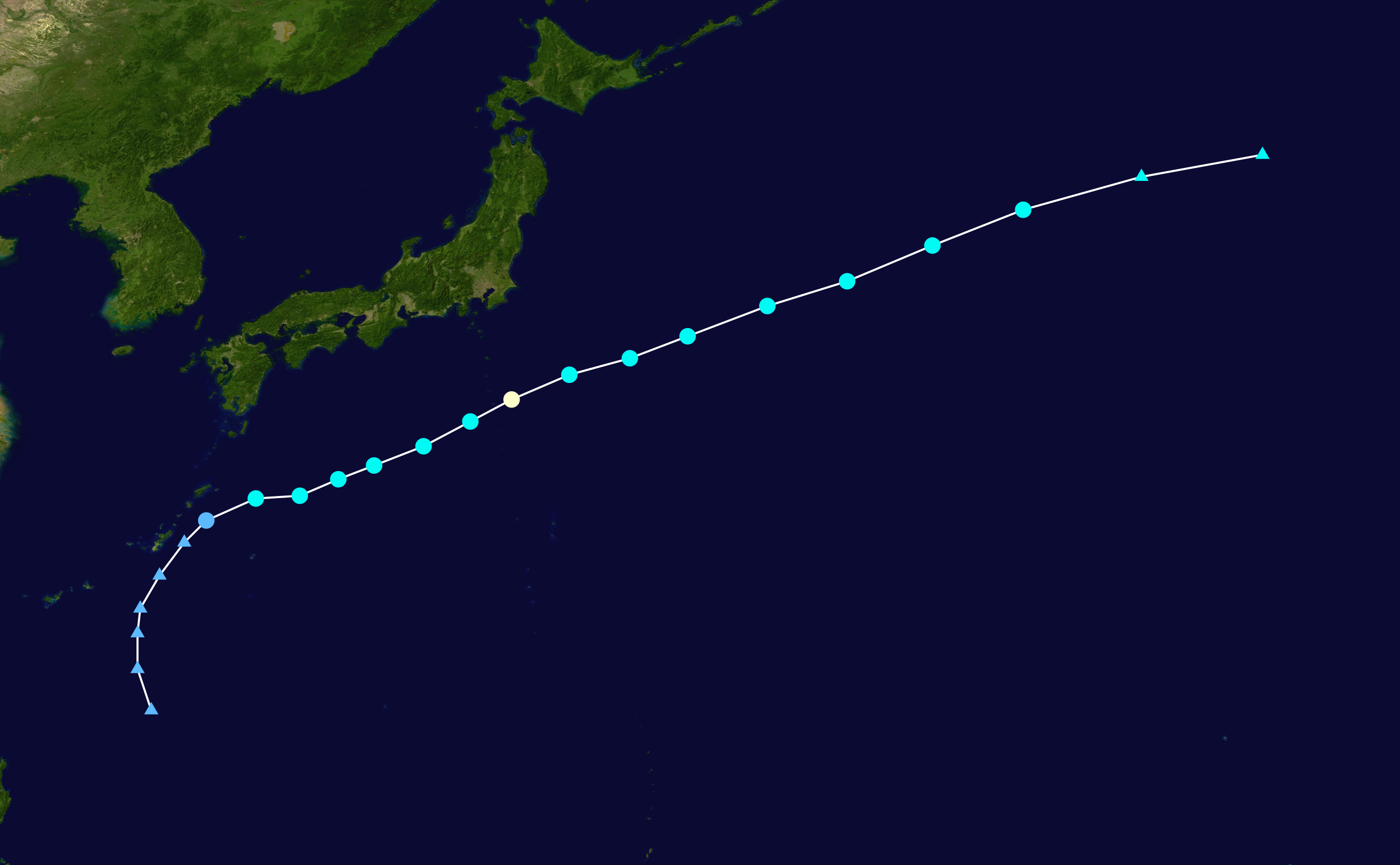
- Duration: September 5 – September 10
- Peak intensity: 110 km/h (70 mph) (10-min); 975 hPa (mbar)

After nearly a month of tropical inactivity, the JMA started to track a tropical depression over to the southeast of Okinawa during September 5. During September 6, the depression rapidly organized into a tropical storm, assigning the name Fengshen. On September 7, Fengshen strengthened into a severe tropical storm as it started to move northeastwards. By September 9, Fengshen briefly reached its peak intensity as a severe tropical storm, with the JTWC considering it as a typhoon, with 1-minute sustained winds of 120 kilometres per hour (75 mph) as it made a ragged eye. Fengshen collided with a developing front and started to weaken east of Japan, and was downgraded to a tropical storm. Both agencies issued their final warning on Fengshen later that day during September 10.

=== Tropical Depression 14W (Karding) ===
- Tropical depression (JMA)
- Tropical depression (SSHWS)
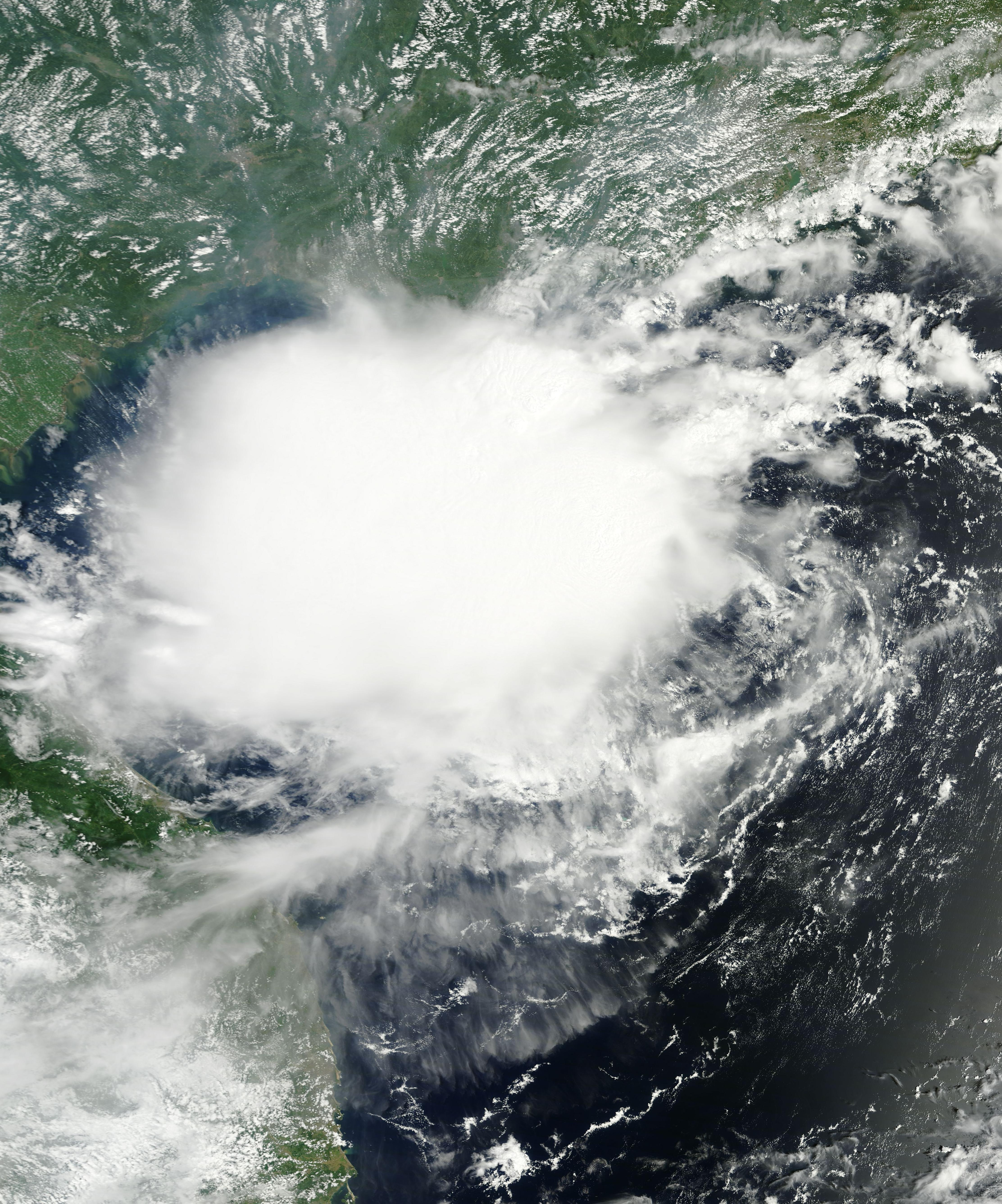
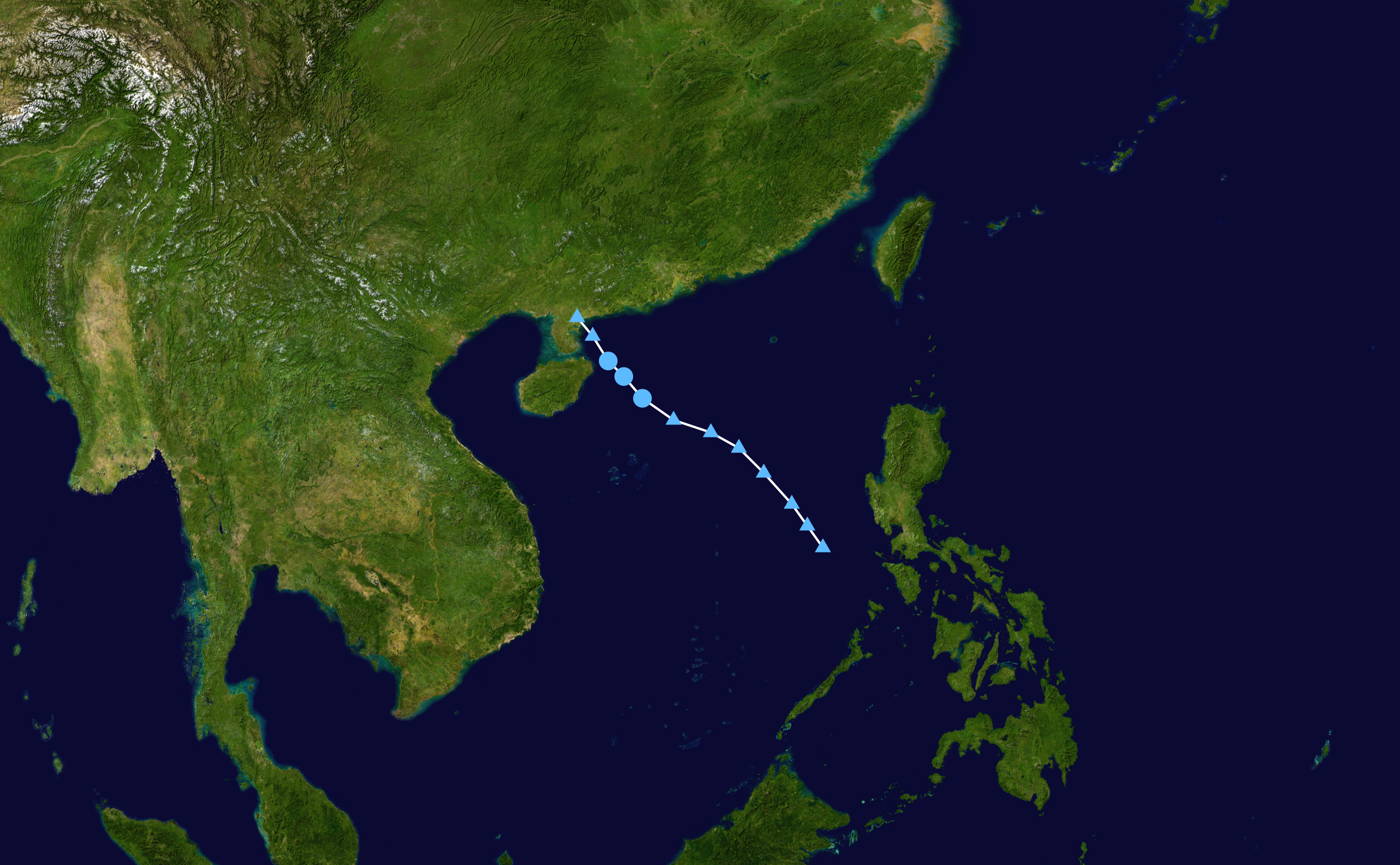
- Duration: September 5 – September 8
- Peak intensity: 55 km/h (35 mph) (10-min); 1004 hPa (mbar)

Late on September 5, the JMA reported that a tropical depression had developed out of an area of low pressure that had crossed central Luzon and was now located about 430 km (265 mi) to the south-west of Manila. During the next day, JTWC issued a TCFA while PAGASA named the depression Karding. JTWC classified it as Tropical Depression 14W on September 7, due to strong banding clouds surrounding the center. However, this did not continue as JMA made their final warning due to the large amount of disorganization.

=== Typhoon Kalmaegi (Luis) ===
- Typhoon (JMA)
- Category 1 typhoon (SSHWS)
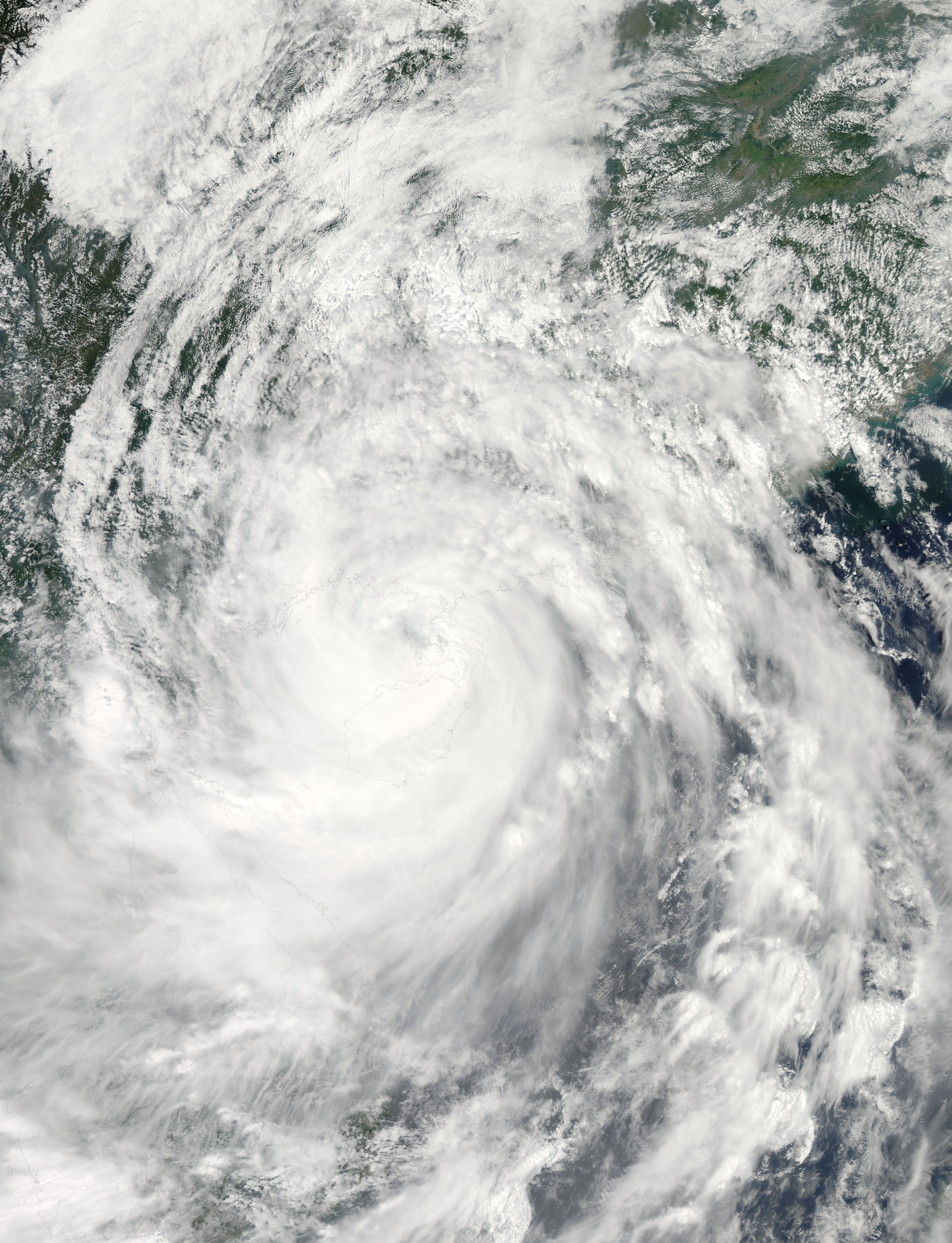
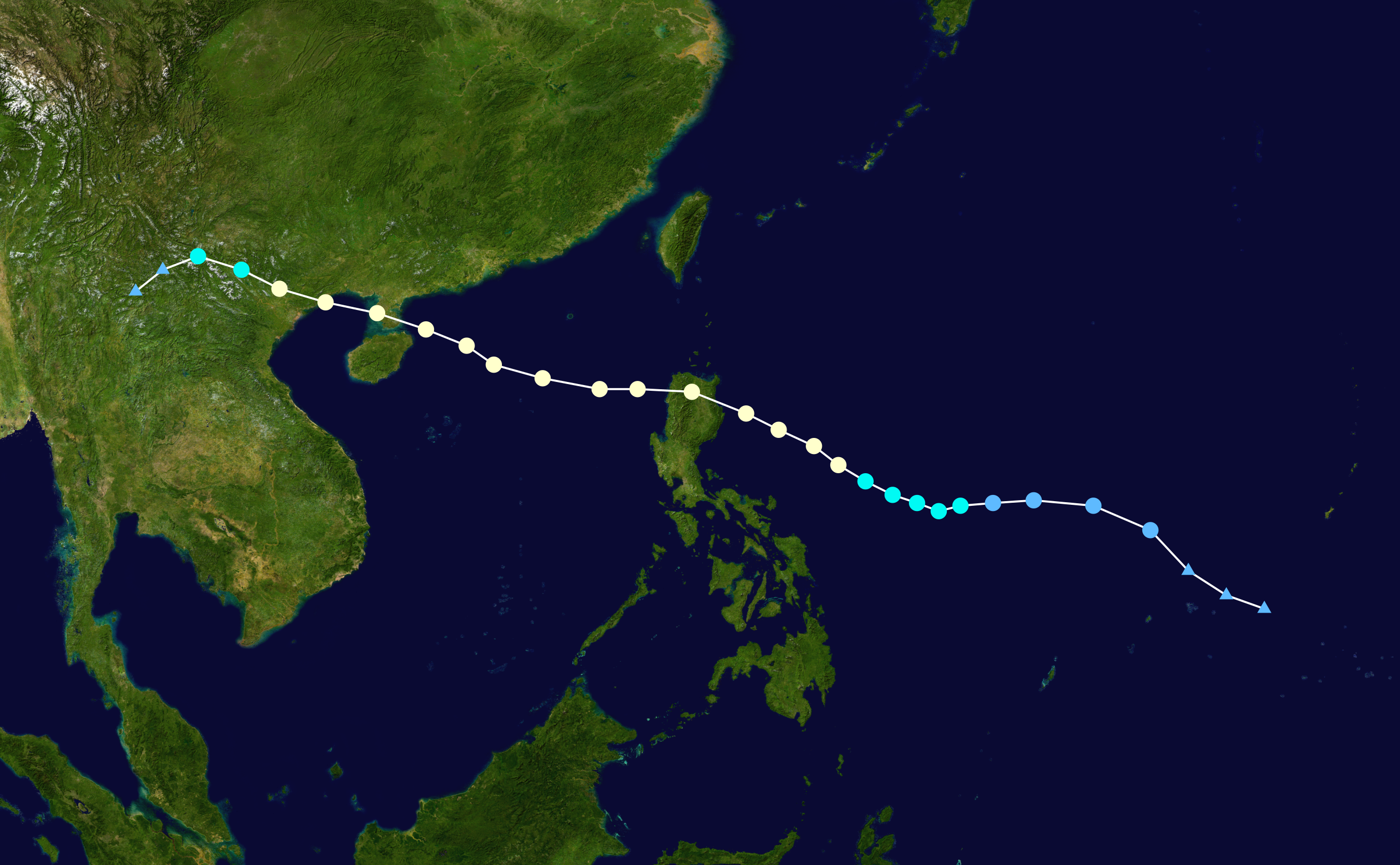
- Duration: September 11 – September 17
- Peak intensity: 140 km/h (85 mph) (10-min); 960 hPa (mbar)

Tropical Depression 15W developed about 332 km (206 mi) to the east of Yap during September 11. At the same time, PAGASA had issued their first advisories on the storm, naming the system as Luis. During the next day, the system steadily intensified into a tropical storm and was named Kalmaegi by the JMA. By September 13, Kalmaegi intensified into a Category 1 typhoon, where it made landfall over in Cagayan early the next day, as it start to interact with land and the JMA downgraded Kalmaegi to a severe tropical storm. On September 15, Kalmaegi entered the South China Sea and intensified to a typhoon again, where it reached its peak intensity with sustained winds of 140 kilometres per hour (87 mph) while making its second landfall over Hainan Island. Kalmaegi rapidly weakened to a large tropical storm as it continued to move in a westward direction. Both agencies classified Kalmaegi as a tropical depression and the system fully dissipated on September 17.

About 200 homes were destroyed with 600 damaged in the Philippines. The province of Pangasinan was under a "state of calamity" due to flash floods and Cagayan province experienced many landslides after the storm during September 16–17. According to the NDRRMC on September 19, 12 people have been killed while damages were reported up to ₱1.2 billion (US$27.3 million). Over in southern China, a total of 90,000 people evacuated during September 16 over in Hainan. Kalmaegi killed a total of 11 people and caused about CN¥17.74 billion (US$2.89 billion) in damages. The typhoon also affected Vietnam, killing about 13 people, with damage losses of about ₫20 billion (US$944 thousand). Moreover, the remnants of Kalmaegi moved over parts of East India bringing landslides, where it also destroyed several roads during September 21–23. An additional 12 people were killed over in the city of Meghalaya.

=== Tropical Storm Fung-wong (Mario) ===
- Tropical storm (JMA)
- Tropical storm (SSHWS)
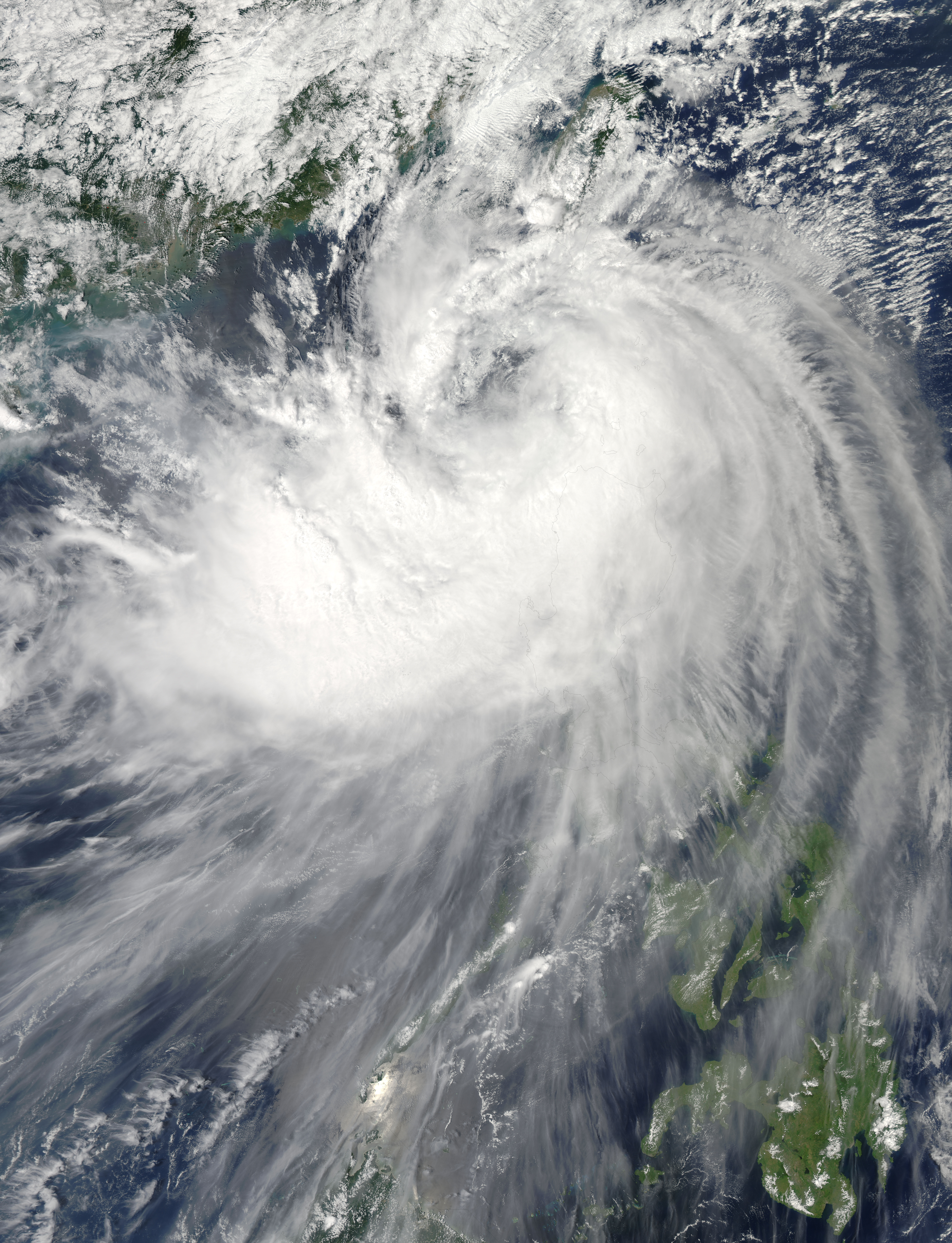
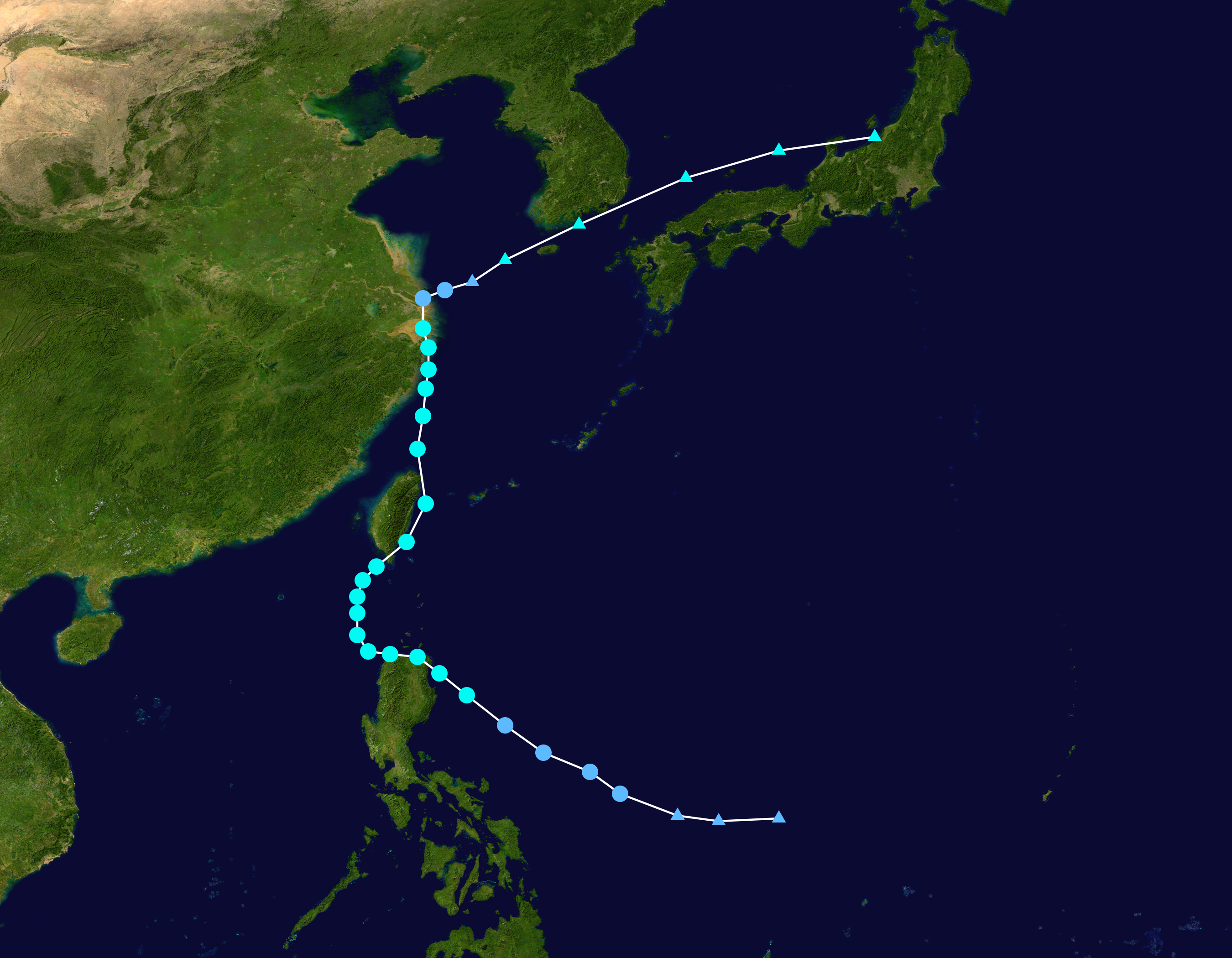
- Duration: September 17 – September 24
- Peak intensity: 85 km/h (50 mph) (10-min); 985 hPa (mbar)

During September 17, the JMA started to track a tropical depression as it had entered the Philippine Area of Responsibility and PAGASA subsequently named it, Mario. The JTWC also classified it as Tropical Depression 16W in the same time it was named. Mario later intensified into a tropical storm, with JMA assigning the name Fung-wong as it neared Luzon. By September 19, Fung-wong made landfall over in the northern tip of Cagayan. Early on September 20, JMA upgraded it to severe tropical storm strength, although in post-analysis, Fung-wong only reached tropical storm strength at its maximum intensity. Moving northward, the storm made landfall on the shores of the southeastern part of Taiwan during the next day. Fung-wong later weakened due to land reaction. Both agencies downgraded Fung-wong to a tropical depression, just as it was making landfall over Shanghai on September 23. On September 24, Fung-wong started to interact with a frontal system and both the JMA and the JTWC issued their final advisory on the system, stating that it had become extratropical. Its remnants dissipated over in the Korean Peninsula on September 25.

During September 19, Fung-wong combined with the southwest monsoon brought extensive rainfall and flooding throughout most of the Philippines, and many say that Metro Manila had its worst flooding since 2009. Quezon City had a precipitation total of 268 mm in less than six hours and the Marikina River reached the level of 20 meters, causing many people to evacuate within the area. 21 flights have been delayed over in Clark International Airport and many power outages occurred in many provinces. Total damage loss recorded from the NDRRMC had reached to ₱3.4 billion (US$76.4 million), and a total of 18 people were killed with an additional 16 missing. In addition to those, similar to Karding, hail was reported over in Makati on September 18. Moreover, rainfall in Taiwan also canceled many flights and killed three people. Fung-wong also killed a person in mainland China, and total economic losses were counted to be CNY 950 million (US$155 million).

=== Severe Tropical Storm Kammuri ===
- Severe tropical storm (JMA)
- Tropical storm (SSHWS)
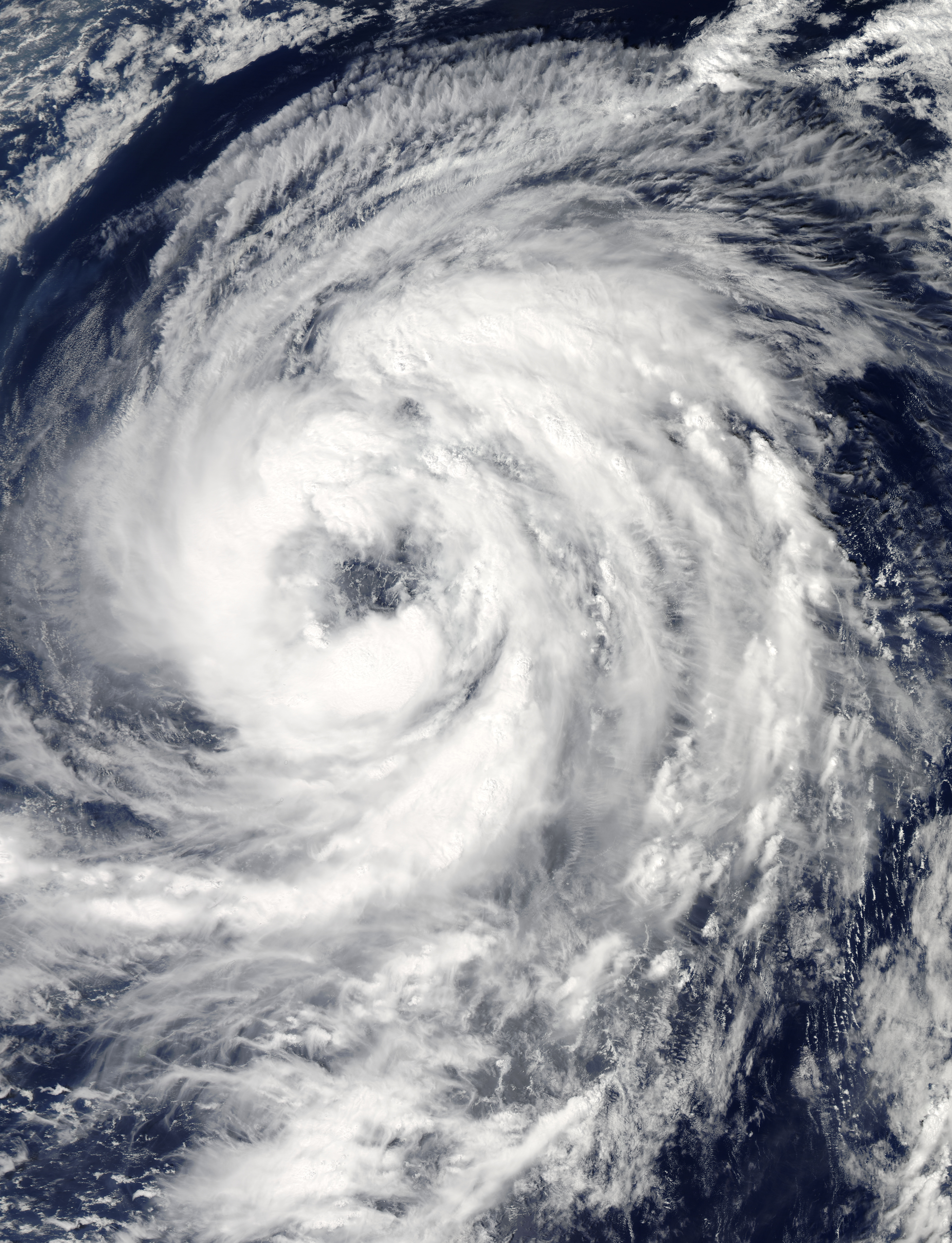
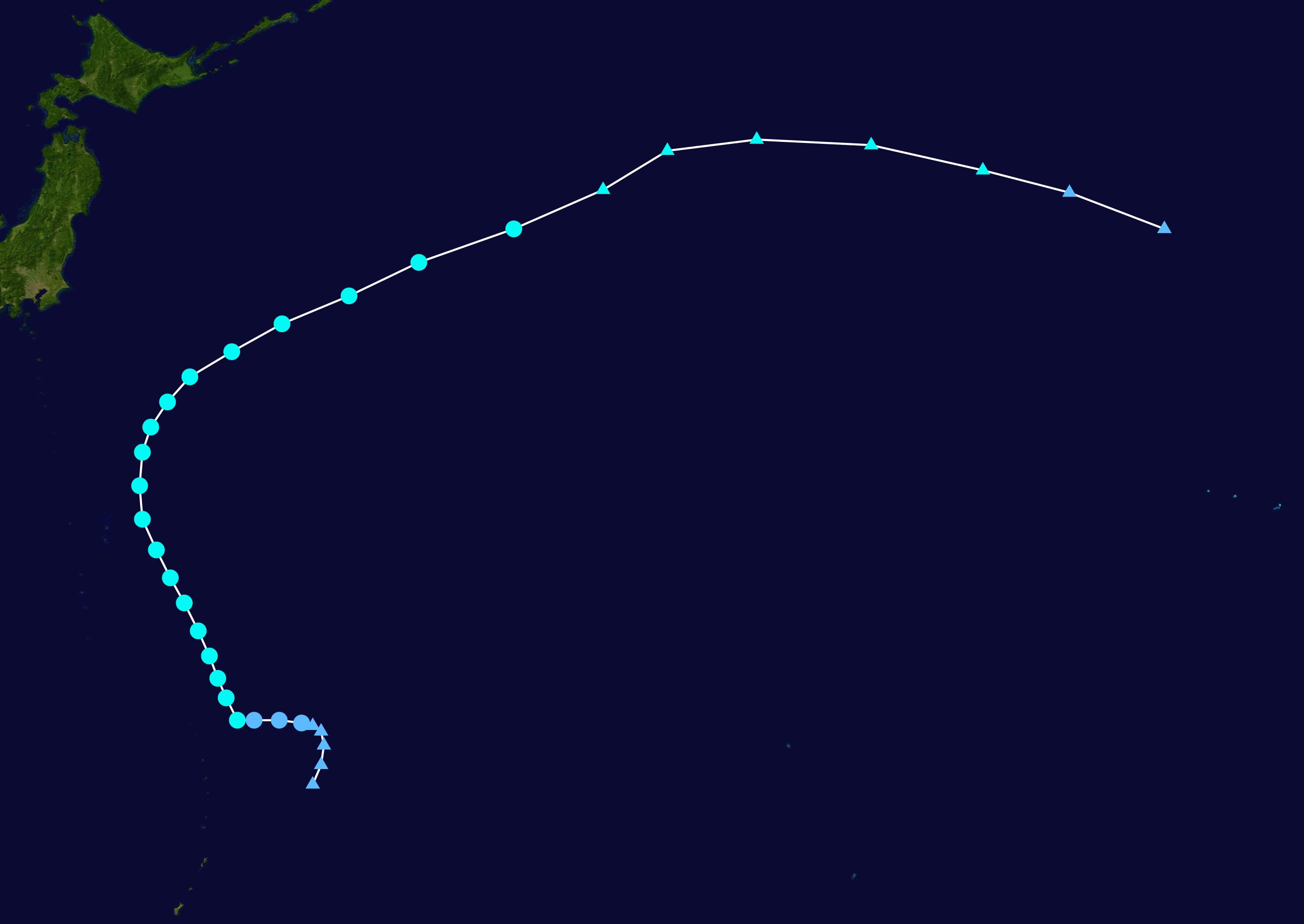
- Duration: September 23 – September 30
- Peak intensity: 95 km/h (60 mph) (10-min); 985 hPa (mbar)

On September 23, a tropical depression had developed near the Mariana Islands and during the next day, the JTWC designated the system as Tropical Depression 17W. At the same time, 17W had strengthened into Tropical Storm Kammuri. As the low-level circulation improved, Kammuri became more organized. With this, a large eye started to develop. On September 26, the JMA upgraded the system to a severe tropical storm and reached peak intensity with sustained winds of 95 kilometres per hour (59 mph). By September 27, Kammuri started to interact with a frontal system as it started to weaken back into a tropical storm. The JTWC issued its final advisory on September 29 as they stated it had become extratropical. Though, the JMA tracked Kammuri until early the next day. Kammuri's remnants exited the basin and was last monitored late on October 1.

=== Typhoon Phanfone (Neneng) ===
- Very strong typhoon (JMA)
- Category 4 super typhoon (SSHWS)
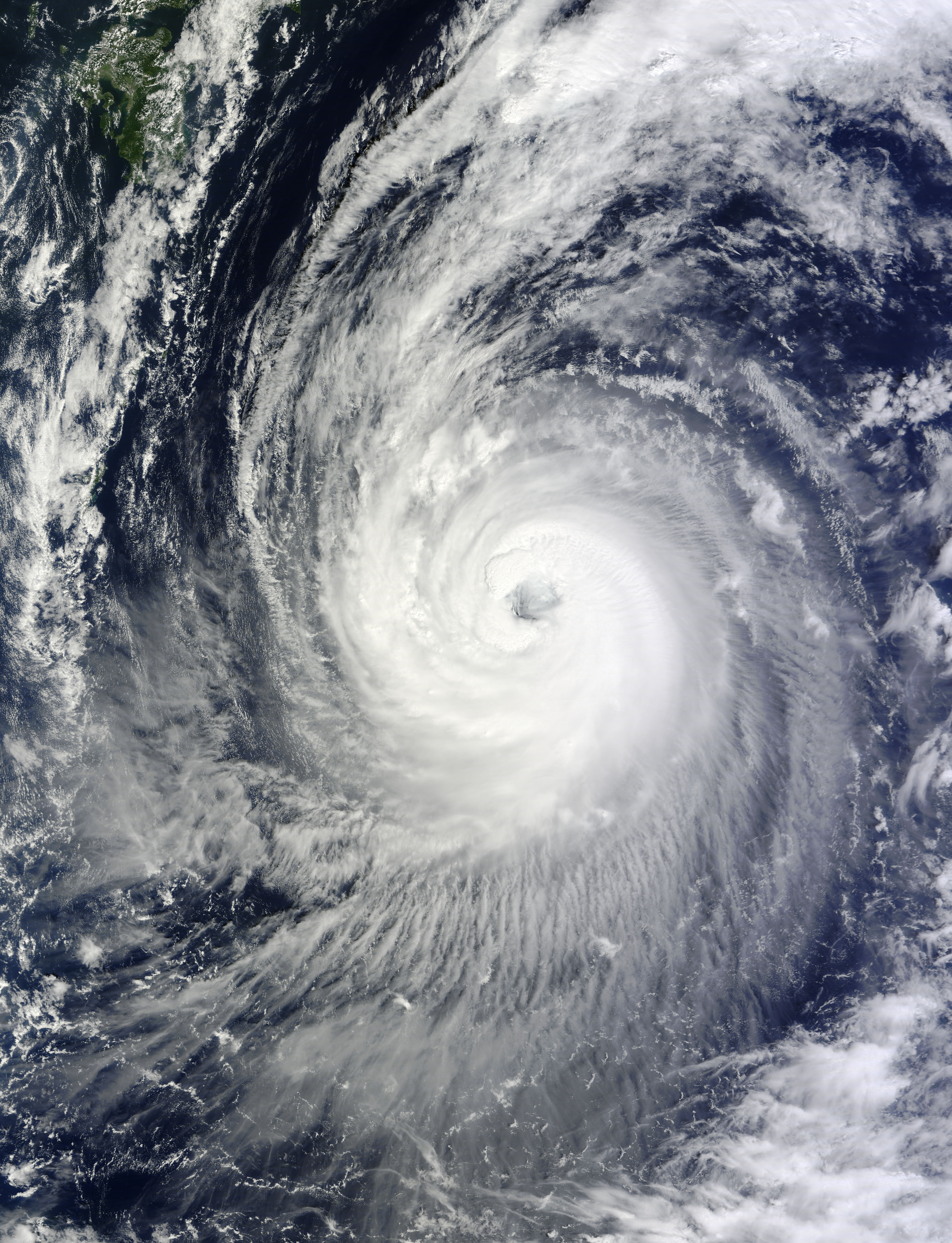
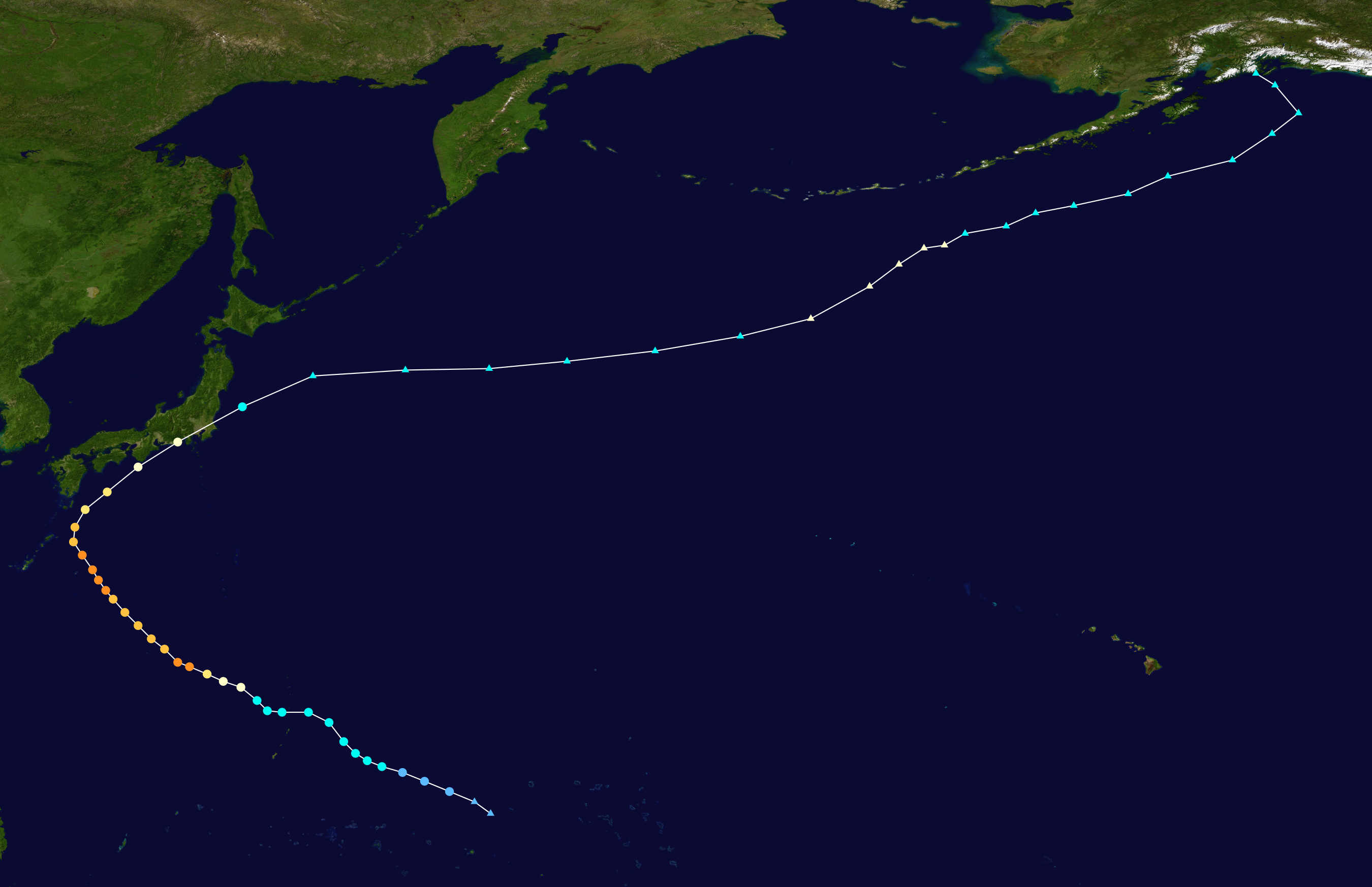
- Duration: September 28 – October 6
- Peak intensity: 175 km/h (110 mph) (10-min); 935 hPa (mbar)

On September 26, a large area of convection persisted well west of the International Date Line. At the same time, JTWC had classified it as a tropical disturbance. The JMA classified this to a tropical depression on September 28, while the JTWC designated it as 18W the next day. On September 29, 18W intensified into Tropical Storm Phanfone, due to very favorable conditions and intense thunderstorms rich with convection surrounding the storm's center. Due to these factors, Phanfone continued displaying signs of intensification later that day. Phanfone strengthened into a minimal typhoon late on September 30. But due to warm sea-surface temperatures and very favorable environments, Phanfone underwent rapid deepening on October 1. The next day, Phanfone strengthened into a category 4 typhoon. However, the storm then weakened to a category 3. This is due to its eye replacing the old one and undergoing a minor eyewall replacement cycle, although the JTWC upgraded Phanfone to a category 4 again late on October 3. At the same time, Phanfone entered the PAR, with PAGASA assigning the name Neneng, although the storm exited the basin several hours later. On October 4, Phanfone reached its peak intensity, with the JTWC classifying it as a super typhoon. The storm steadily weaked as it approached Japan, and after it affected Japan, the JTWC issued its last advisory on the system on October 6, as it tracked northeastwards and extremely affected by strong vertical wind shear.

Phanfone affected the Formula One 2014 Japanese Grand Prix, bringing strong winds and heavy rainfall which made the track surface wet and significantly reduced visibility. Because of this, the race had to be red flagged twice; the first time because the torrential rain made conditions too treacherous to race in and the second time because of a fatal accident involving Jules Bianchi, which was partially caused by the wet track conditions. Agricultural damage in Japan was calculated at ¥7.7 billion (US$70.7 million), while total economic losses nationwide were estimated at ¥10.5 billion (US$100 million) by Aon Benfield.

=== Typhoon Vongfong (Ompong) ===
- Violent typhoon (JMA)
- Category 5 super typhoon (SSHWS)
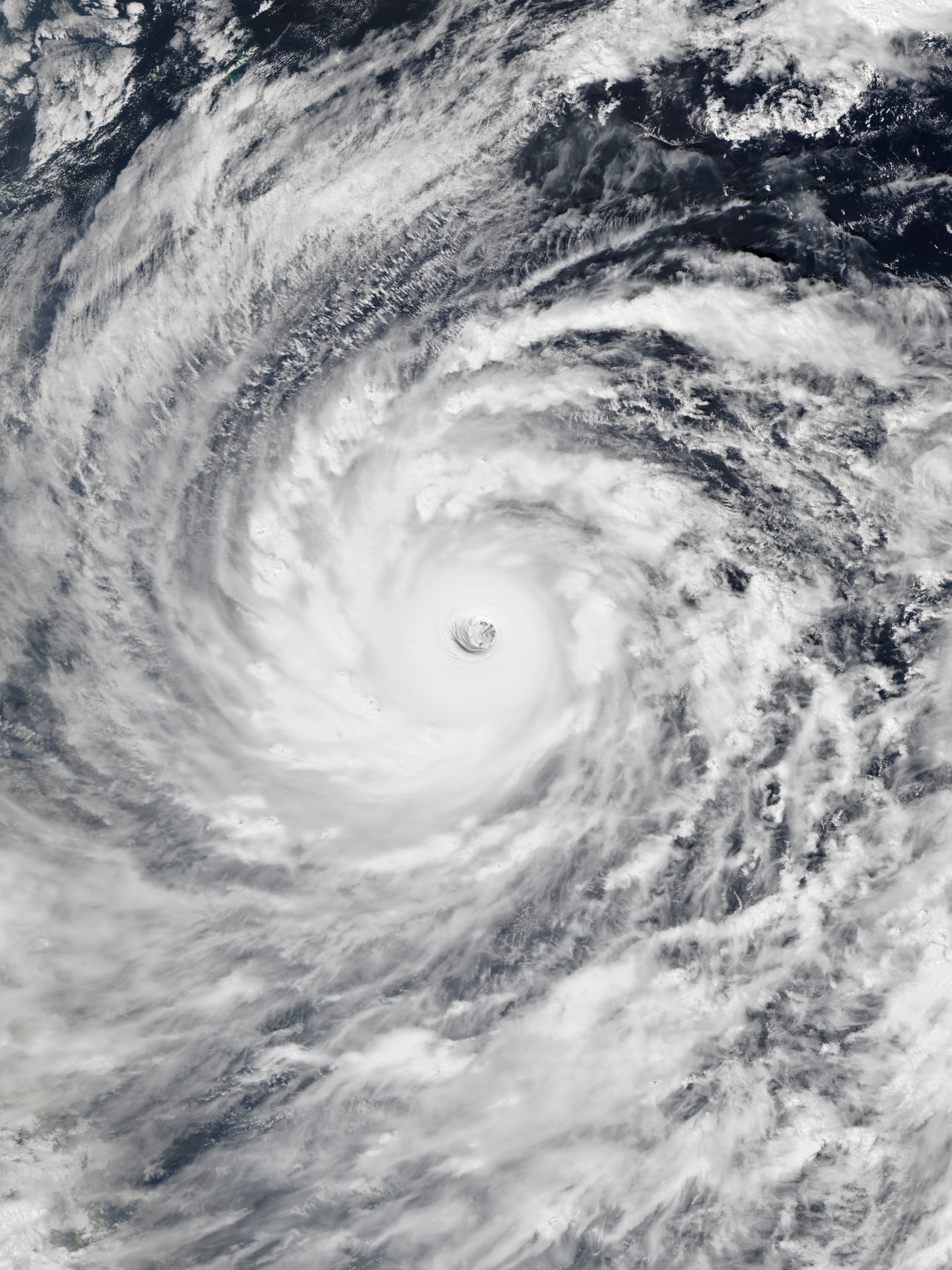
- Duration: October 2 – October 14
- Peak intensity: 215 km/h (130 mph) (10-min); 900 hPa (mbar)

On October 2, the JMA started to monitor a tropical depression that had developed over in the Marshall Islands. During the next day, it was deemed as 19W by the JTWC, and was upgraded to Tropical Storm Vongfong a few hours later. Due to a strong outflow, Vongfong intensified into a minimal typhoon as it affected the Mariana Islands. During the next day, Vongfong entered an area of favorable environments where it allowed the system to undergo a phase of rapid deepening, and as a result, it was upgraded to a Category 3 typhoon by the JTWC later that day on October 7. Late on October 7, PAGASA declared that Vongfong had entered their area of responsibility, and named it Ompong. On October 8, Vongfong explosively intensified from a Category 3 to a Category 5 super typhoon, where it peaked with winds of 215 kilometres per hour (134 mph) and a minimum pressure of 900 hPa, making Vongfong the most powerful tropical cyclone of 2014, and the most intense since Typhoon Haiyan. Although Vongfong maintained its intensity, the typhoon undergo an eyewall replacement cycle and this made Vongfong to weaken late the next day. On October 10, the JTWC downgraded Vongfong to a category 3 typhoon, as its convection started to weakened slightly. This also made the system weakened to a category 2 typhoon early on October 11, and passed by the island of Okinawa. Vongfong made landfall over southwestern Japan on October 13, just as both agencies downgraded it to a strong tropical storm, though the JTWC issued its final warning a few hours later. Dry air surrounded to southern periphery of Vongfong as the JMA issued its final advisory early on October 14. Vongfong's extratropical remnants exited basin early on October 16, and fully dissipated a day later.

According to the NDRRMC, 4 people were killed due to heavy flooding as of October 18. Damages were estimated at PhP62.6 million (US$1.4 million). In Japan, where it was known as “Typhoon No. 19” (台風第19号), Vongfong left some devastation throughout the country. On October 13, a 90-year-old man was found dead in an irrigation channel in Yazu, Tottori, as well as a 72-year-old man in Shikokuchūō, Ehime, who drowned after driving his light truck into a pond. One man went missing after three people were swept into water at the port of Chichibu, Saitama on October 12; he was confirmed dead later. Moreover, Vongfong also injured at least 96 people in the 23 prefectures of Japan. 33 people in Okinawa were injured, including a 9-year-old girl in Naha and a male in his 20s in Itoman with their fingers sandwiched between doors. 14 people in Hyōgo were injured, including a 56-year-old female in Kobe getting fractured by strong winds when riding a bicycle. Agriculture damages in Japan were calculated at ¥11.9 billion (US$111 million), including ¥865 million (US$8.03 million) from Okinawa.

=== Typhoon Nuri (Paeng) ===
- Violent typhoon (JMA)
- Category 5 super typhoon (SSHWS)
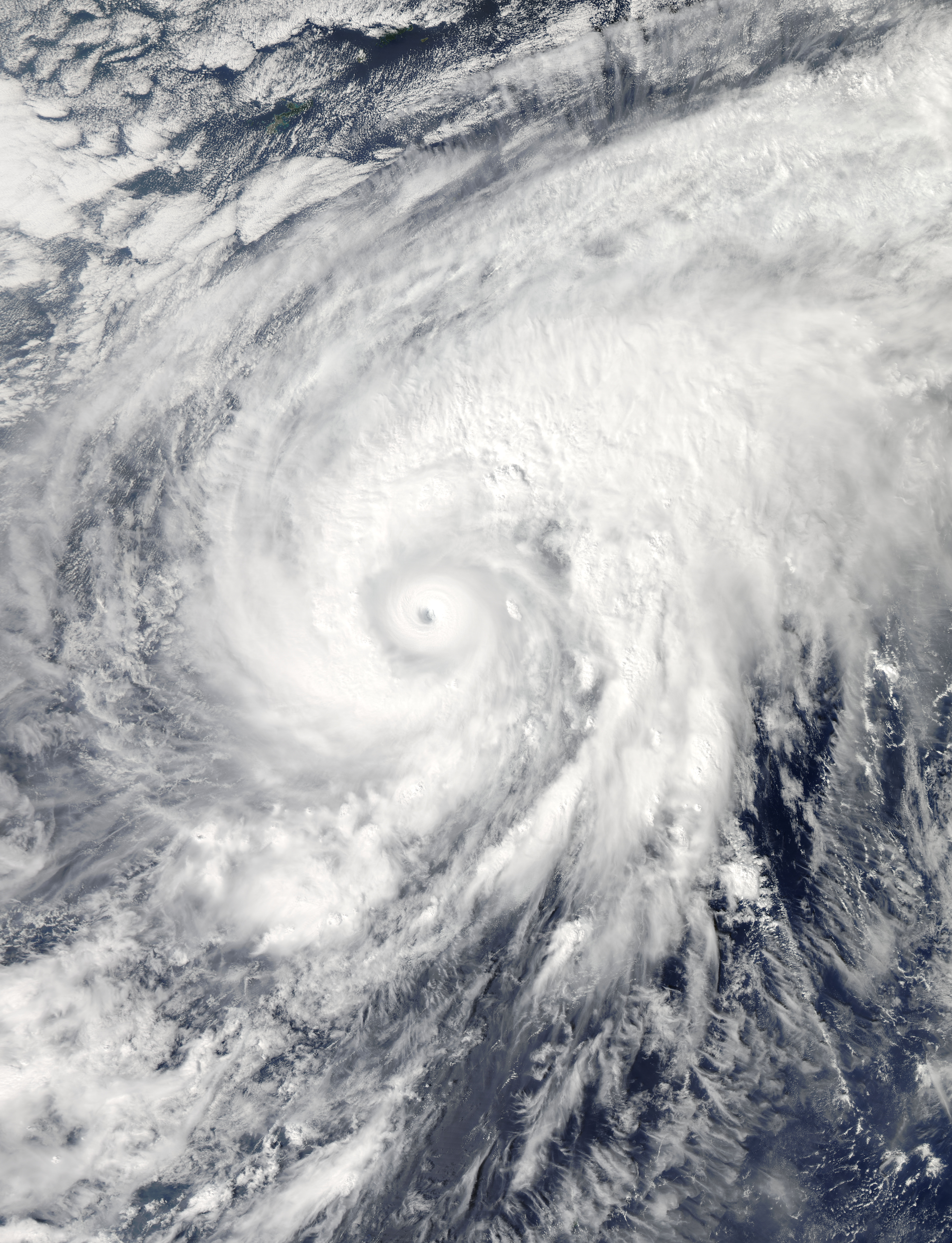
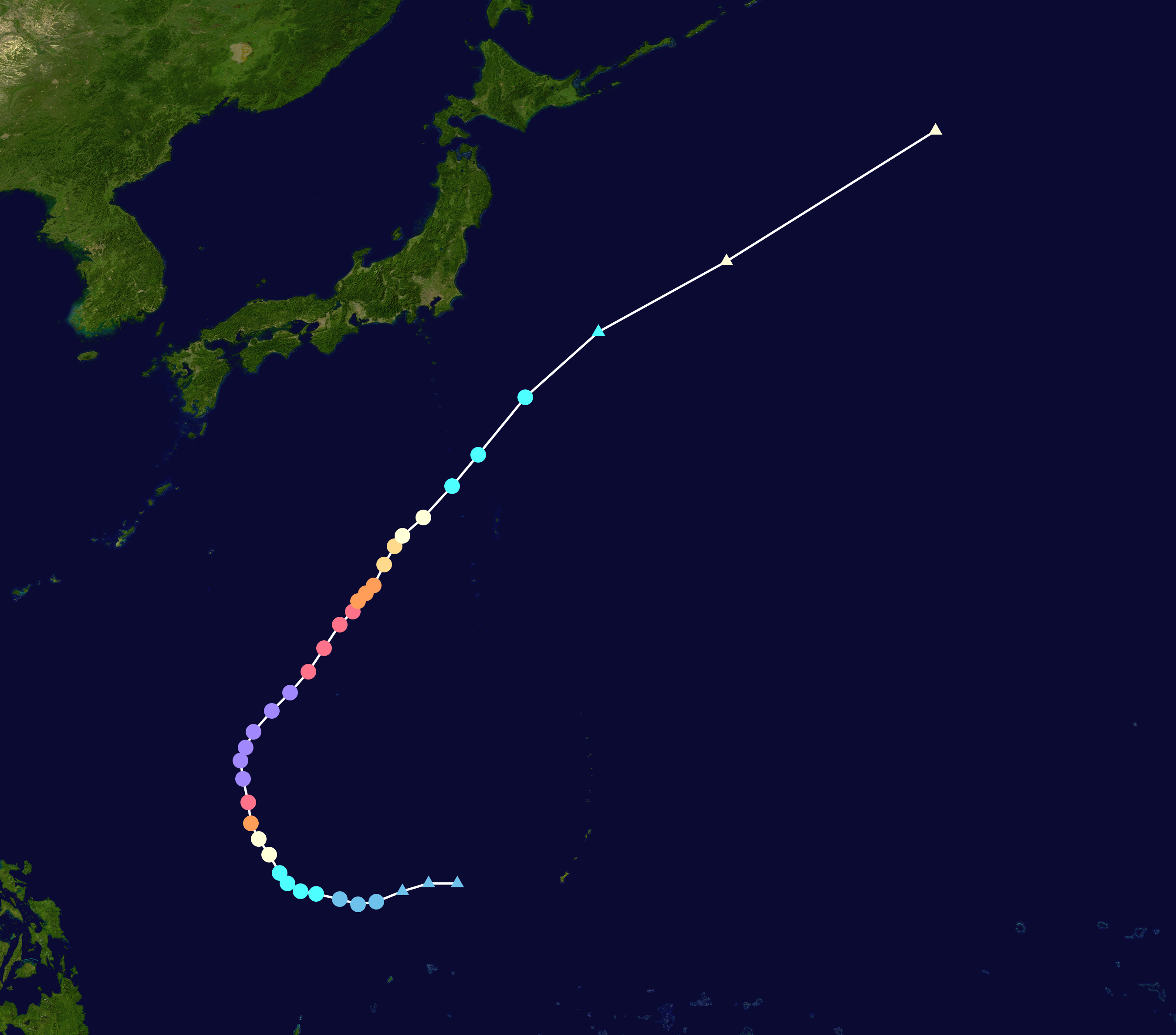
- Duration: October 30 – November 6
- Peak intensity: 205 km/h (125 mph) (10-min); 910 hPa (mbar)

The JMA started to track tropical depression on October 30 in the Philippine Sea. On the following day, the JTWC issued warnings on the tropical depression, which was designated as 20W. Later that day, both agencies upgraded 20W to a tropical storm, with the name Nuri. Early on November 1, Nuri gradually intensified as it entered the PAR, with PAGASA naming it Paeng. Later that day, the JMA upgraded the storm to a severe tropical storm. Due to an increase of convective activity, Nuri had rapidly intensified into a typhoon by both agencies. On November 2, Nuri had undergone a phase of rapid deepening from a minimal typhoon to a super typhoon in a period of 24 hours. Late on November 2, Nuri had attained its peak intensity, with maximum sustained winds of 285 kilometres per hour (177 mph), tied with Vongfong, though its minimum pressure was recorded at 910 hPa. Some shear and cool sea-surface temperatures caused Nuri to weaken later that day as it rapidly moved northeastward. Both the JMA and the JTWC downgraded Nuri to a Category 3 typhoon on November 5. Around that time, the storm underwent an eyewall replacement cycle and Nuri quickly weakened, due to vertical wind shear. During November 6, Nuri had transitioned into an extratropical cyclone, as both agencies stopped issuing advisories on the system. Nuri's extratropical remnant split into two low-pressure systems on November 7, and Nuri's original low was later absorbed by the new, more powerful extratropical cyclone on the same day.

=== Tropical Storm Sinlaku (Queenie) ===
- Tropical storm (JMA)
- Tropical storm (SSHWS)
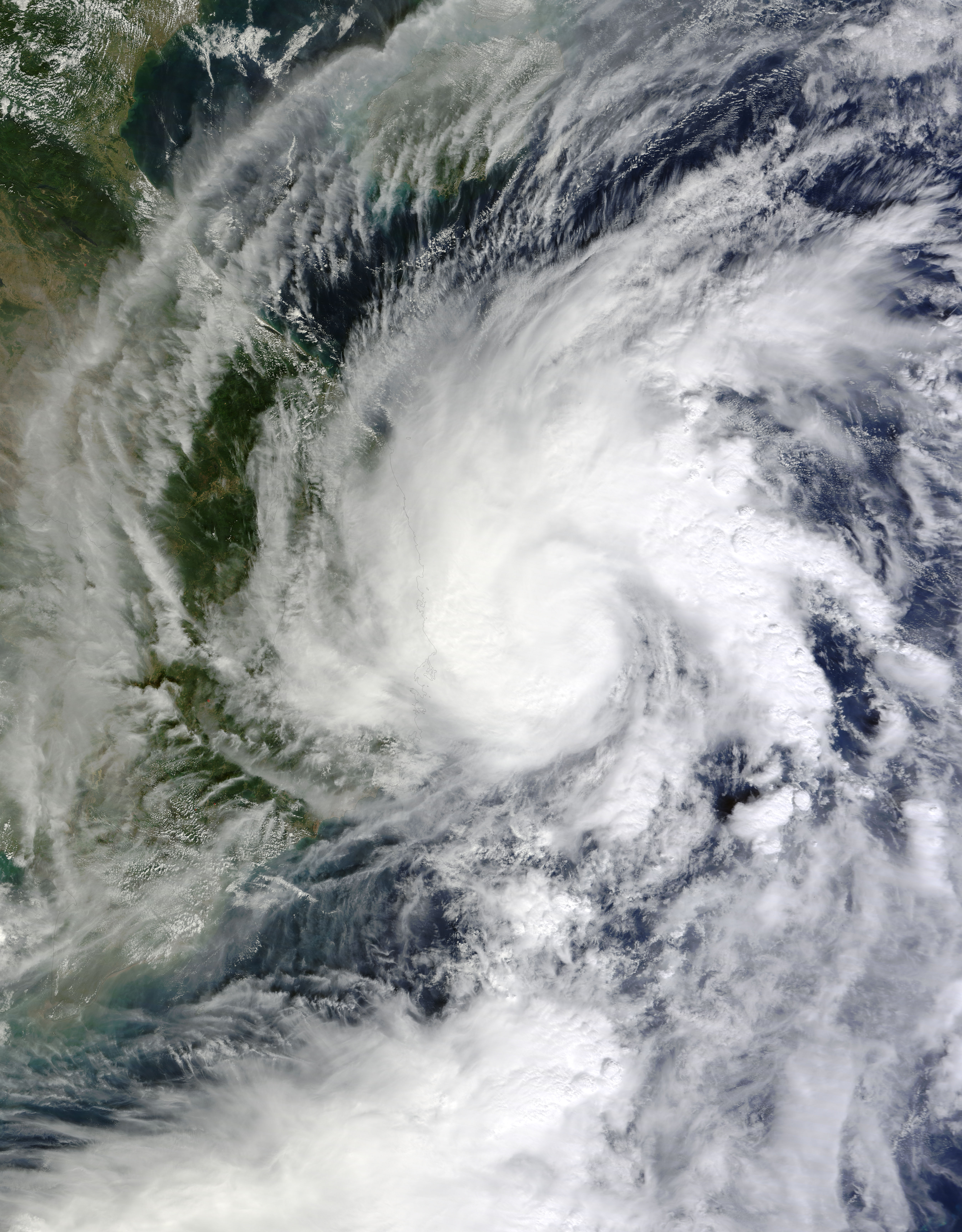
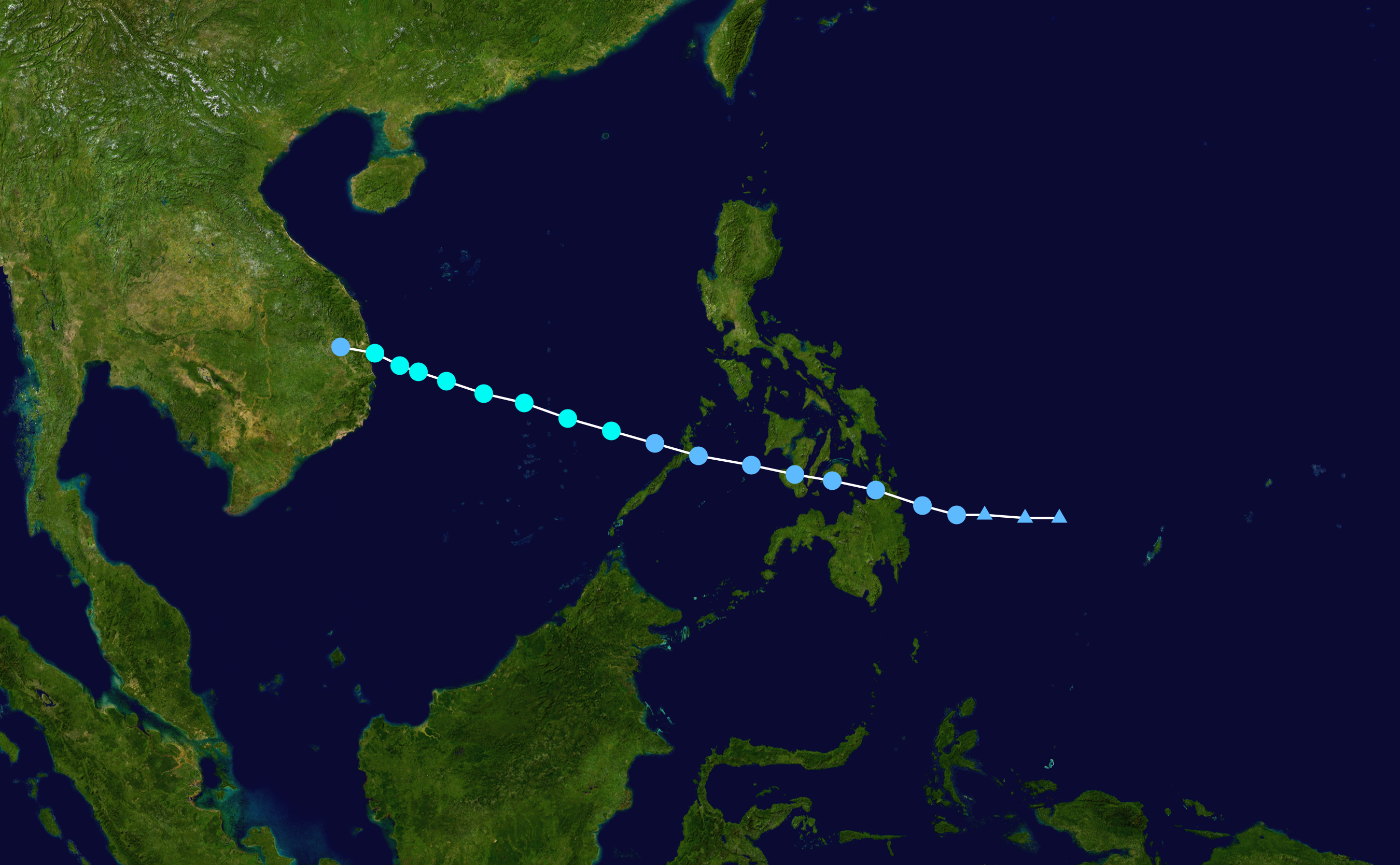
- Duration: November 26 – November 30
- Peak intensity: 85 km/h (50 mph) (10-min); 990 hPa (mbar)

On November 23, a cluster of thunderstorms was located near the equator. Late on November 24, a broad area of low-pressure develops well east of Mindanao, Philippines. On November 26, the area gradually developed convection near its center and PAGASA had upgraded it to Tropical Depression Queenie. Later the same day, both the JMA and the JTWC classified Queenie as a tropical depression, with the JTWC also designating it as 21W. On November 28, the JMA upgraded the system to a tropical storm, assigning the name Sinlaku, while the JTWC followed suit. Due to low vertical windshear, Sinlaku gathered strength while it was on the South China Sea. The next day, convective activity increased near the storm's center. At the same time, the JMA upgraded Sinlaku to a severe tropical storm, however according to its best track, the JMA peaked its intensity as a strong tropical storm. Later that day, Sinlaku made landfall over Vietnam as it started to weaken. Both agencies downgraded the system to a tropical depression early on November 30 and made their final advisories later that day.

As a tropical depression, Sinlaku lashed the Visayas, killed 4 people and the infrastructural damage were at Php2.66 million (US$60,000). Damage in Vietnam was standing at VND 90 billion (US$4.2 million).

=== Typhoon Hagupit (Ruby) ===
- Violent typhoon (JMA)
- Category 5 super typhoon (SSHWS)
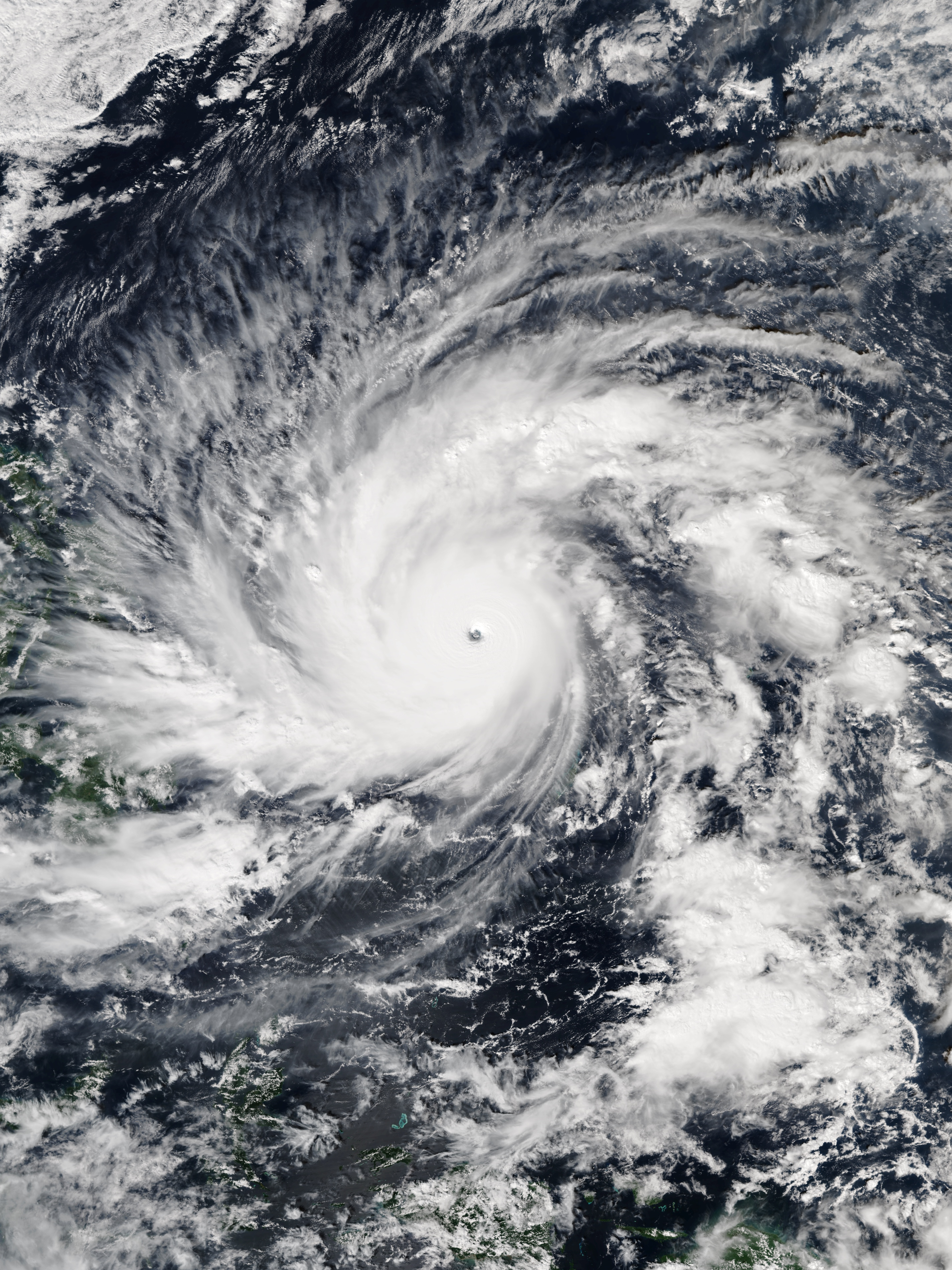
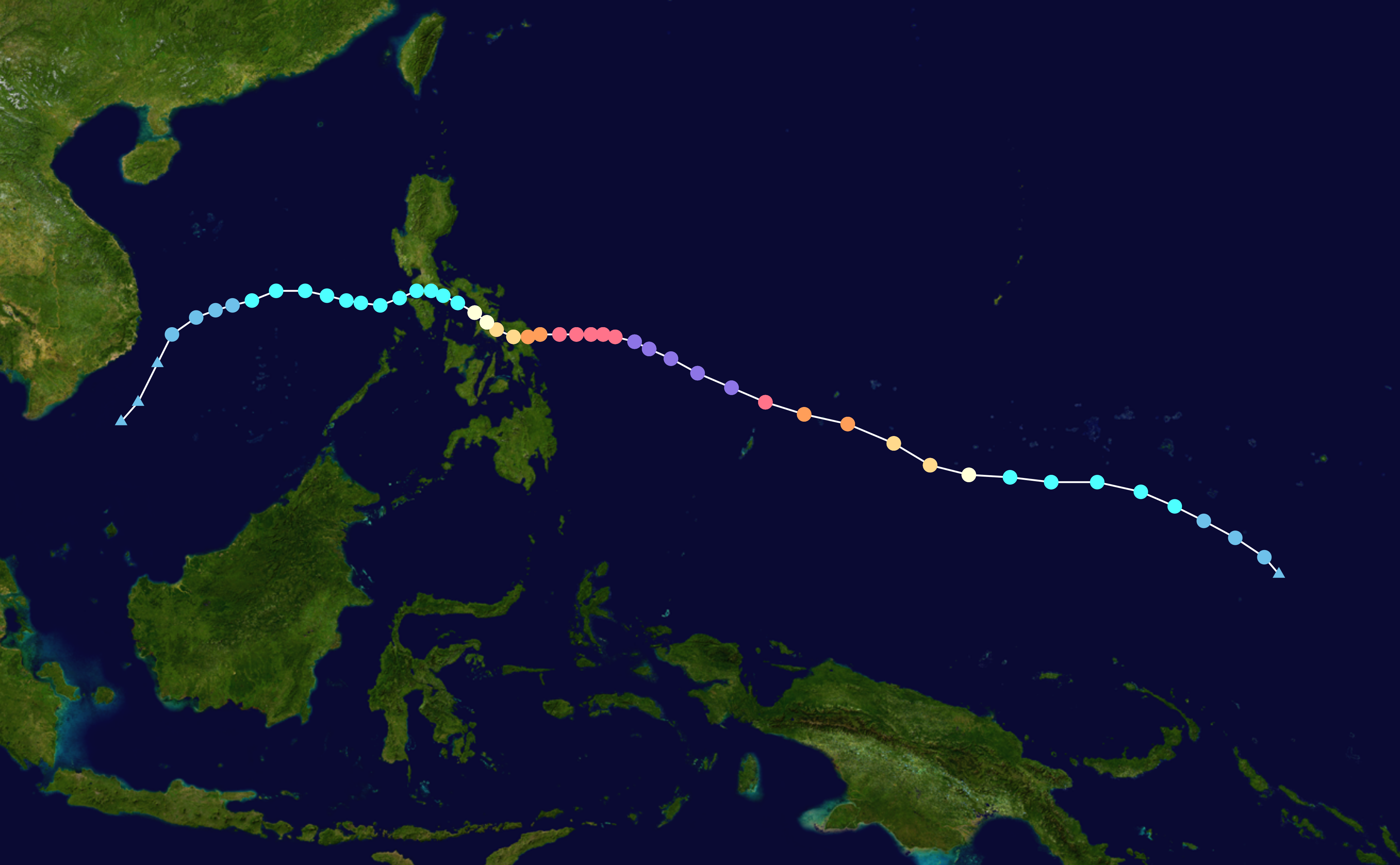
- Duration: November 30 – December 12
- Peak intensity: 215 km/h (130 mph) (10-min); 905 hPa (mbar)

On November 30, the JMA started to track a tropical depression about 530 km (330 mi) south-southwest of Kosrae, however operationally it was tracked early the next day. By December 1, the JTWC started issuing advisories as the system has intensified into a tropical storm, assigning the name Hagupit. Hagupit intensified into a typhoon the next day. During December 3, Hagupit started to undergo a phase of explosive intensification from a Category 2 typhoon to a Category 5 super typhoon, as a clear and well-defined eye developed. Later the same day, Hagupit entered the PAR, with PAGASA giving the name Ruby. Early on December 4, Hagupit reached its peak intensity with 10-minute sustained winds of 215 kilometres per hour (134 mph) and a minimum barometric pressure of 905 hPa. Thereafter, the typhoon encountered moderate vertical windshear from the east and started an eyewall replacement cycle as it weakened to a Category 4 super typhoon. The JTWC downgraded Hagupit to a Category 3 typhoon just before December 7. Hagupit made landfall over Eastern Samar and encountered land reaction, as it further weakened to a Category 2 typhoon. Hours later, the system moved in a northwestward direction and made its second landfall over Masbate. The next day, both agencies downgraded Hagupit to a severe tropical storm, due to its continued slow movement and land reaction as it made its third landfall over the island of Marinduque. During its fourth landfall over Batangas, the JMA downgraded it to a tropical storm. On December 9, Hagupit emerged to the South China Sea, retaining its tropical storm intensity. Although due to an increase of deep convection near the center, Hagupit slightly strengthened, though its intensity remained at tropical storm strength. By December 12, Hagupit weakened to a tropical depression until both agencies issued their final advisory on the storm. The JMA tracked it until it dissipated just southeast of Ho Chi Minh City, Vietnam later the same day.

As of December 19, at least 18 people had been confirmed dead by the typhoon, leaving nearly 916 injured according to the NDRRMC. Total financial loss were calculated at PhP5.09 billion (US$114 million).

=== Tropical Storm Jangmi (Seniang) ===
- Tropical storm (JMA)
- Tropical storm (SSHWS)
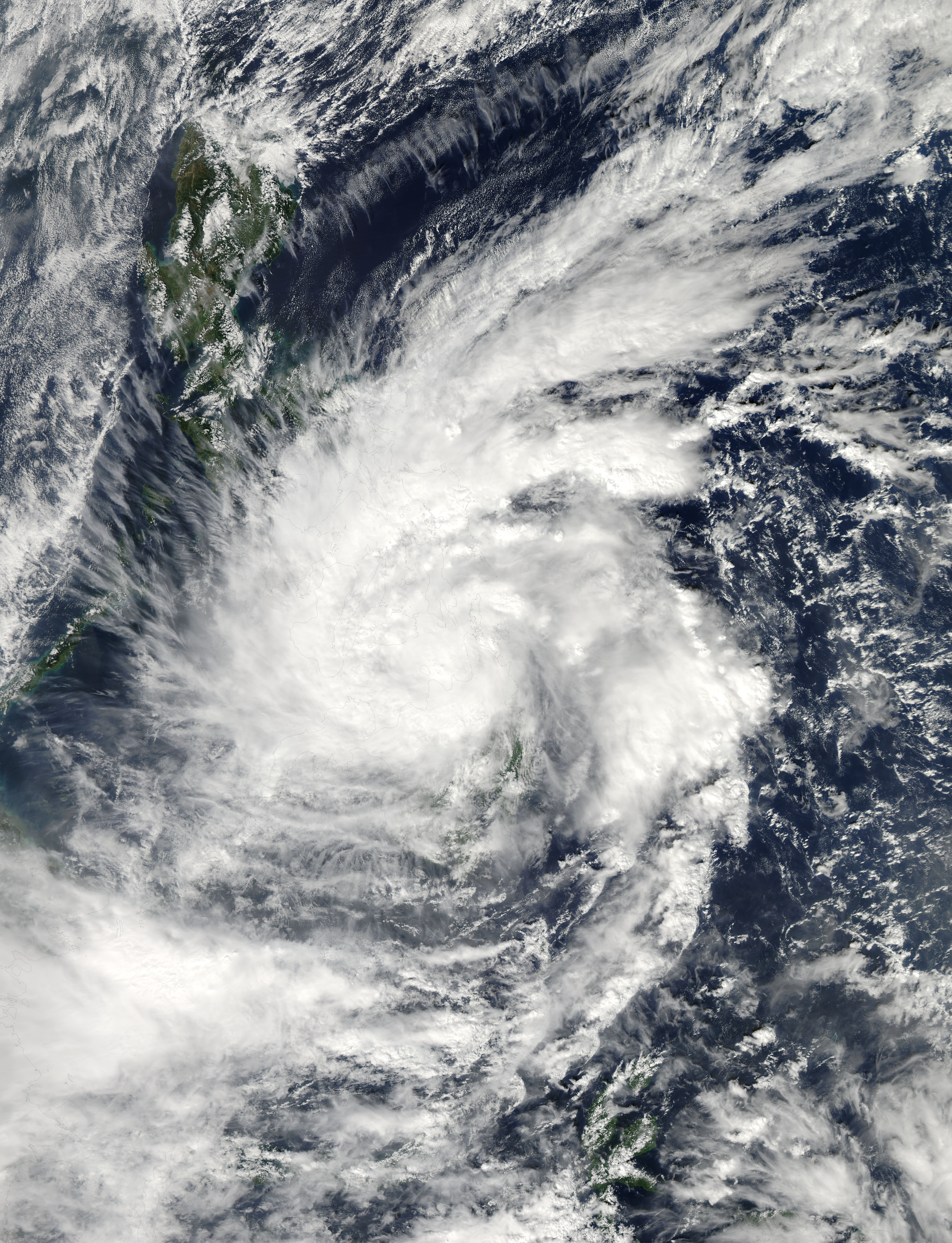
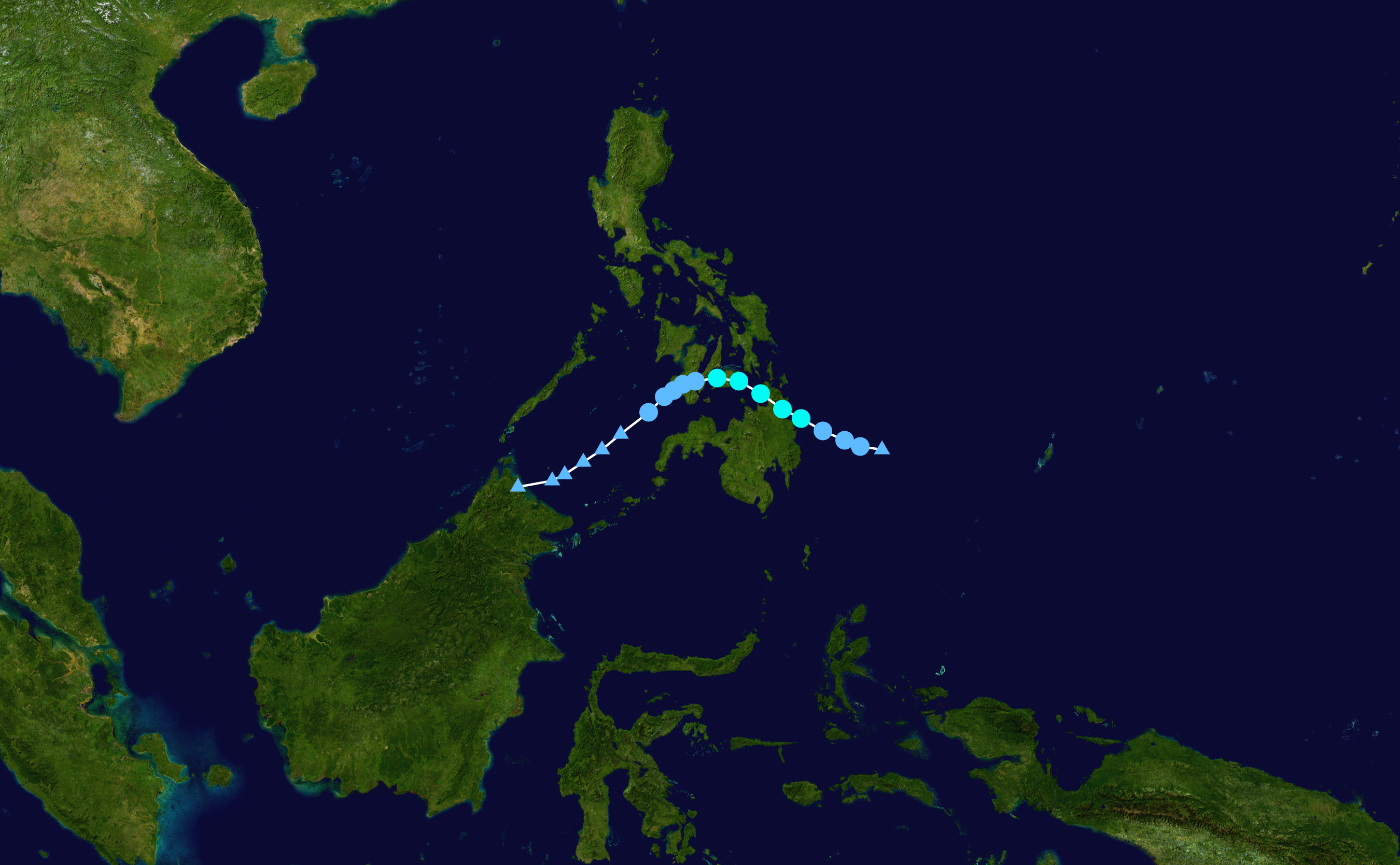
- Duration: December 28, 2014 – January 1, 2015
- Peak intensity: 75 km/h (45 mph) (10-min); 996 hPa (mbar)

On December 28, Tropical Depression 23W developed about 630 km (390 mi) to the west of the island of Palau. PAGASA also named the system as Seniang. A few hours later, the system had rapidly organized and was considered as a tropical storm, with the name Jangmi. By December 29, Jangmi made landfall over the town of Hinatuan in the province of Surigao del Sur and briefly reached its peak strength packing maximum winds of 85 kilometres per hour (53 mph). The storm traversed the Caraga region, and exited the landmass of Mindanao as the system had slowly weakened. During the next day, Jangmi made landfall over Cebu and southern Negros, right before the JTWC downgraded it to a tropical depression. Both agencies made their final warning on Jangmi on January 1, 2015, as the 2015 Pacific typhoon season started.

It produced heavy rains and caused flooding in Southern Philippines. The storm caused 66 deaths with 6 missing, overall damage in the Philippines were at ₱1.27 billion (US$28.4 million).

=== Other systems ===
During March 11, the JMA monitored a tropical depression that had developed about 195 km (120 mi) to the east of Mati City, Philippines. Over the next day the system moved westwards, before it was last noted within the Celebes Sea on March 12. On April 19, the JMA reported that a tropical depression had developed about 490 km (300 mi) southwest of Hagåtña, Guam. Due to less convection and cool waters on April 21, the depression weakened to a disturbance while still moving west. The remnants of the depression affected the northern Philippines and dissipated on April 23, due to land interaction. On July 19, a tropical depression formed to the southeast of Guam. It slowly moved in a northwest direction over the next few days. Early on July 22, the JTWC issued a TCFA Alert, but later that day, the system lost its organization, and was downgraded to a low-pressure area. On August 19, the JMA briefly monitored a tropical depression, that had developed along the coast of China to the northeast of Hong Kong.

During August 24, from a post-analysis by the JMA, a tropical depression had developed well to the southeast of Tokyo, Japan. The system dissipated on August 26 as it was absorbed by a cold front associated with an extratropical system to its north. Convectional cloudiness persisted over the Philippines, contributing to bring heavy rainfall on August 25. The area intensified into a low-pressure area as it moved to the South China Sea the next day. It was classified as a tropical depression on August 27 by the JMA. The depression affected Hainan Island, Southern China and northern Vietnam by heavy rainfall and flash floods as it was moving in a westward direction. On August 29, the system weakened to an remnant low just east of the 100th meridian east. A low-pressure area formed from an upper-level low several kilometers east-southeast of Japan on August 31. It started to organize and the southern part of the system has winds of tropical depression strength. On September 4, JMA upgraded it to a tropical depression. Although the system moved into an area of moderate vertical wind shear. With this, the system became extratropical late on September 5.

== Storm names ==
Within the North-western Pacific Ocean, both the Japan Meteorological Agency (JMA) and the Philippine Atmospheric, Geophysical and Astronomical Services Administration assign names to tropical cyclones that develop in the Western Pacific, which can result in a tropical cyclone having two names. The Japan Meteorological Agency's RSMC Tokyo — Typhoon Center assigns international names to tropical cyclones on behalf of the World Meteorological Organization's Typhoon Committee, should they be judged to have 10-minute sustained windspeeds of 65 km/h (40 mph). While the Philippine Atmospheric, Geophysical and Astronomical Services Administration assigns names to tropical cyclones which move into or form as a tropical depression in their area of responsibility located between 135°E and 115°E and between 5°N-25°N even if the cyclone has had an international name assigned to it. The names of significant tropical cyclones are retired, by both PAGASA and the Typhoon Committee. Should the list of names for the Philippine region be exhausted then names will be taken from an auxiliary list of which the first ten are published each season. Unused names are marked in gray.

=== International names ===
During the season 23 tropical storms developed in the Western Pacific and 22 were named by the JMA, when the system was judged to have 10-minute sustained windspeeds of 65 km/h (40 mph). The JMA selected the names from a list of 140 names, that had been developed by the 14 members nations and territories of the ESCAP/WMO Typhoon Committee.

Lingling	Kajiki	Faxai	Peipah	Tapah	Mitag	Hagibis	Neoguri	Rammasun	Matmo	Halong
Nakri	Fengshen	Kalmaegi	Fung-wong	Kammuri	Phanfone	Vongfong	Nuri	Sinlaku	Hagupit	Jangmi

- Additionally, Genevieve entered the Western Pacific basin from the Central Pacific basin after crossing the International Date Line (180°E) as a tropical cyclone. As the system crossed between basins intact, it retained the name assigned to it by the National Hurricane Center.

==== Retirement ====
After the season, at their 47th Session in 2015 the ESCAP/WMO Typhoon Committee announced the name Rammasun was removed from the naming lists due to the damages and deaths it caused in the Philippines and China, and it will not be used again for another typhoon name. In February 2016, it was subsequently replaced by Bualoi for future seasons, respectively.

=== Philippines ===
Agaton	Basyang	Caloy	Domeng	Ester
Florita	Glenda	Henry	Inday	Jose
Karding	Luis	Mario	Neneng	Ompong
Paeng	Queenie	Ruby	Seniang	Tomas (unused)
Usman (unused)	Venus (unused)	Waldo (unused)	Yayang (unused)	Zeny (unused)
Auxiliary list
Agila (unused)	Bagwis (unused)	Chito (unused)	Diego (unused)	Elena (unused)
Felino (unused)	Gunding (unused)	Harriet (unused)	Indang (unused)	Jessa (unused)

During the season PAGASA used its own naming scheme for the 19 tropical cyclones, that either developed within or moved into their self-defined area of responsibility. The names were taken from a list of names, that had been last used during 2010 and were scheduled to be used again during 2018. All the names are the same, except for the name Jose and Karding, which replaced Juan and Katring, respectively. Storms were named Jose, Karding, Mario and Ruby for the first time (and only, in cases of Jose, Mario and Ruby). Mario and Ruby replaced Milenyo and Reming in 2006, but were not used in 2010.

At the start of 2014 the name Kanor was originally scheduled to replace Katring, however, PAGASA replaced it with the name Karding after obtaining negative feedback from the public.

==== Retirement ====
After the season, the names Glenda, Jose, Mario, Ruby and Seniang were retired by PAGASA, as they had caused over PhP1 billion in damages. They were subsequently replaced on the list with the names Gardo, Josie, Maymay, Rosita and Samuel for the 2018 season.

== Season effects ==
This table will list all the storms that developed in the northwestern Pacific Ocean west of the International Date Line and north of the equator during 2014. It will include their intensity, duration, name, areas affected, deaths, and damage totals. Classification and intensity values will be based on estimations conducted by the JMA. All damage figures will be in 2014 USD. Damages and deaths from a storm will include when the storm was a precursor wave or an extratropical low.

Name	Dates	Peak intensity			Areas affected	Damage (USD)	Deaths	Ref(s).
Name	Dates	Category	Wind speed	Pressure	Areas affected	Damage (USD)	Deaths	Ref(s).
Lingling (Agaton)	January 10–20	Tropical storm	65 km/h (40 mph)	1,002 hPa (29.59 inHg)	Philippines	$12.6 million	70	
Kajiki (Basyang)	January 29 – February 1	Tropical storm	65 km/h (40 mph)	1,000 hPa (29.53 inHg)	Philippines	$202,000	6	
Faxai	February 27 – March 5	Strong typhoon	120 km/h (75 mph)	975 hPa (28.79 inHg)	Caroline Islands, Mariana Islands	Minimal	1	
TD	March 11–12	Tropical depression	Not specified	1,008 hPa (29.77 inHg)	Sulawesi	None	None	
04W (Caloy)	March 17–24	Tropical depression	Not specified	1,004 hPa (29.65 inHg)	Philippines	None	None	
Peipah (Domeng)	April 2–15	Tropical storm	65 km/h (40 mph)	998 hPa (29.47 inHg)	Caroline Islands	None	None	
TD	April 19–21	Tropical depression	Not specified	1,004 hPa (29.65 inHg)	Caroline Islands, Philippines	None	None	
Tapah	April 27 – May 2	Severe tropical storm	95 km/h (59 mph)	985 hPa (29.09 inHg)	None	None	None	
Mitag (Ester)	June 9–12	Tropical storm	75 km/h (47 mph)	994 hPa (29.35 inHg)	Philippines, Taiwan, Japan	None	None	
Hagibis	June 13–17	Tropical storm	75 km/h (47 mph)	996 hPa (29.41 inHg)	Philippines, China, Taiwan, Japan	$198 million	None	
Neoguri (Florita)	July 2–11	Very strong typhoon	185 km/h (115 mph)	930 hPa (27.46 inHg)	Caroline Islands, Guam, Japan	$604 million	3	
Rammasun (Glenda)	July 9–20	Very strong typhoon	165 km/h (103 mph)	935 hPa (27.61 inHg)	Caroline Islands, Guam, Philippines, China, Vietnam	$8.03 billion	225	
Matmo (Henry)	July 16–25	Strong typhoon	130 km/h (81 mph)	965 hPa (28.50 inHg)	Palau, Philippines, Taiwan, China, Korea	$418 million	65	
TD	July 19–22	Tropical depression	Not specified	1,008 hPa (29.77 inHg)	Caroline Islands, Mariana Islands	None	None	
Halong (Jose)	July 27 – August 11	Violent typhoon	195 km/h (121 mph)	920 hPa (27.17 inHg)	Caroline Islands, Mariana Islands, Philippines, Japan, Siberia	$72.8 million	12	
Nakri (Inday)	July 28 – August 4	Severe tropical storm	100 km/h (62 mph)	980 hPa (28.94 inHg)	Japan, Korea	$117,000	16	
Genevieve	August 7–14	Violent typhoon	205 km/h (127 mph)	915 hPa (27.02 inHg)	None	None	None	
TD	August 19	Tropical depression	Not specified	1,006 hPa (29.71 inHg)	Taiwan, China	None	None	
TD	August 24–26	Tropical depression	Not specified	1,006 hPa (29.71 inHg)	None	None	None	
TD	August 27–29	Tropical depression	Not specified	1,004 hPa (29.65 inHg)	China, Vietnam, Laos	None	None	
TD	September 4–5	Tropical depression	Not specified	1,006 hPa (29.71 inHg)	None	None	None	
Fengshen	September 5–10	Severe tropical storm	110 km/h (68 mph)	975 hPa (28.79 inHg)	Japan	None	None	
14W (Karding)	September 5–8	Tropical depression	55 km/h (34 mph)	1,004 hPa (29.65 inHg)	Philippines, China, Vietnam	None	None	
Kalmaegi (Luis)	September 11–18	Strong typhoon	140 km/h (87 mph)	960 hPa (28.35 inHg)	Caroline Islands, Philippines, China, Indochina, India	$2.94 billion	48	
Fung-wong (Mario)	September 17–24	Tropical storm	85 km/h (53 mph)	985 hPa (29.09 inHg)	Philippines, Taiwan, Japan, China, South Korea	$231 million	22	
Kammuri	September 23–30	Severe tropical storm	95 km/h (59 mph)	985 hPa (29.09 inHg)	Mariana Islands, Japan	None	None	
Phanfone (Neneng)	September 28 – October 6	Very strong typhoon	175 km/h (109 mph)	935 hPa (27.61 inHg)	Caroline Islands, Mariana Islands, Japan	$100 million	11	
Vongfong (Ompong)	October 2–14	Violent typhoon	215 km/h (134 mph)	900 hPa (26.58 inHg)	Caroline Islands, Mariana Islands, Taiwan, Japan, South Korea, Kamchatka Peninsula, Alaska	$161 million	9	
Nuri (Paeng)	October 30 – November 6	Violent typhoon	205 km/h (127 mph)	910 hPa (26.87 inHg)	Japan	Minimal	None	
Sinlaku (Queenie)	November 26–30	Tropical storm	85 km/h (53 mph)	990 hPa (29.23 inHg)	Palau, Philippines, Vietnam, Laos, Cambodia	$4.26 million	4	
Hagupit (Ruby)	November 30 – December 12	Violent typhoon	215 km/h (134 mph)	905 hPa (26.72 inHg)	Caroline Islands, Palau, Philippines, Vietnam	$114 million	18	
Jangmi (Seniang)	December 28 – January 1	Tropical storm	75 km/h (47 mph)	996 hPa (29.41 inHg)	Philippines, Borneo	$28.4 million	66	
Season aggregates
32 systems	January 10, 2014 – January 1, 2015		215 km/h (134 mph)	900 hPa (26.58 inHg)		$13 billion	576	

== See also ==
- Tropical cyclones in 2014
- Pacific typhoon season
- List of wettest tropical cyclones
- 2014 Pacific hurricane season
- 2014 Atlantic hurricane season
- 2014 North Indian Ocean cyclone season
- South-West Indian Ocean cyclone seasons: 2013–14, 2014–15
- Australian region cyclone seasons: 2013–14, 2014–15
- South Pacific cyclone seasons: 2013–14, 2014–15
