= Small Cooks =

Islet in Palmerston Island in the Cook Islands, Pacific Ocean

Coordinates: 18°2′18.17″S 163°7′5.57″W

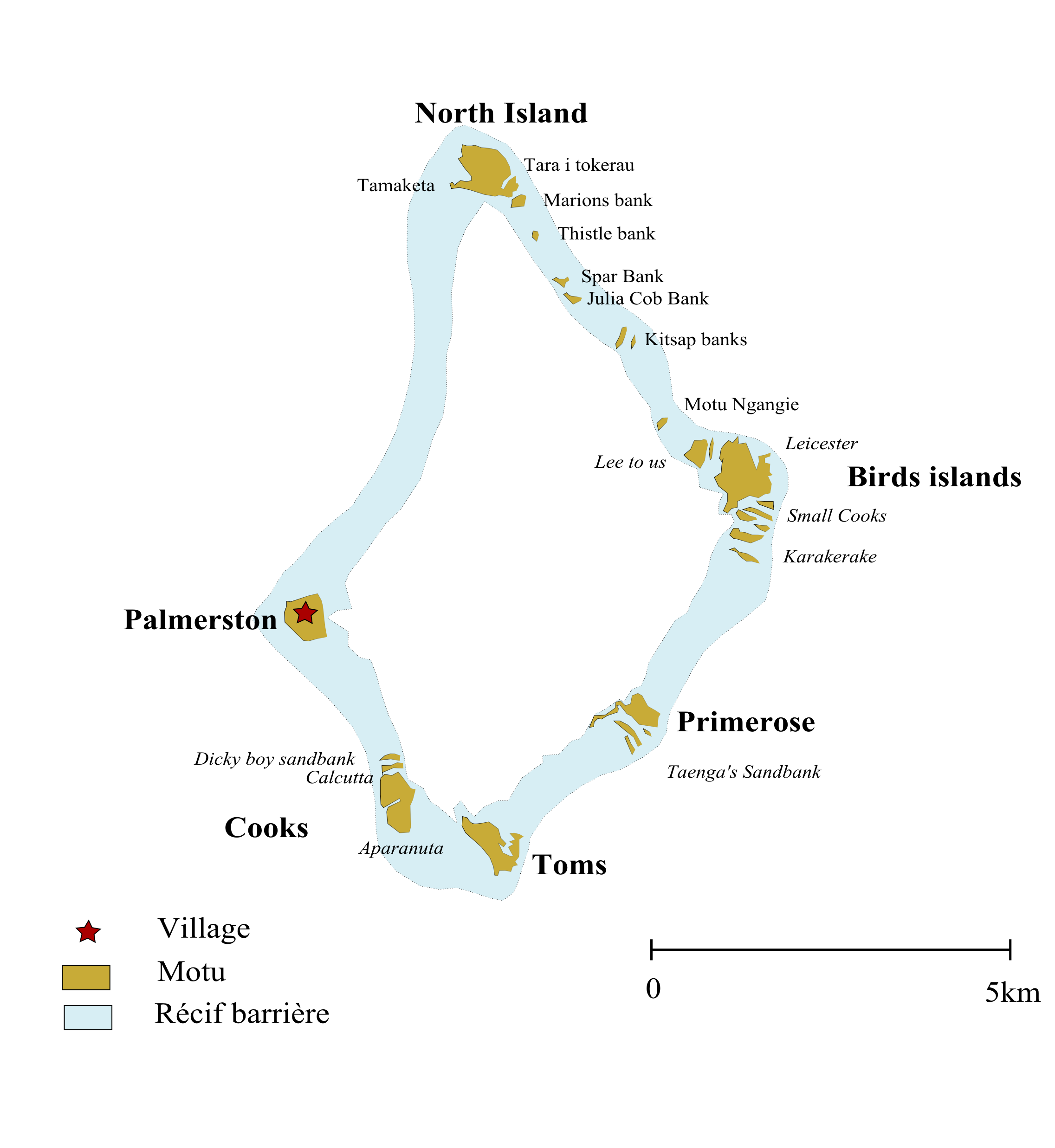
Map of Palmerston

Small Cooks is an islet in Palmerston Island in the Cook Islands. It is on the eastern side of the atoll, between Leicester and Karakerake. Its name is a reference to Cooks, another islet on the atoll.
