= Karakerake =

Islet in Palmerston Island in the Cook Islands, Pacific Ocean

Coordinates: 18°2′32.42″S 163°7′11.52″W

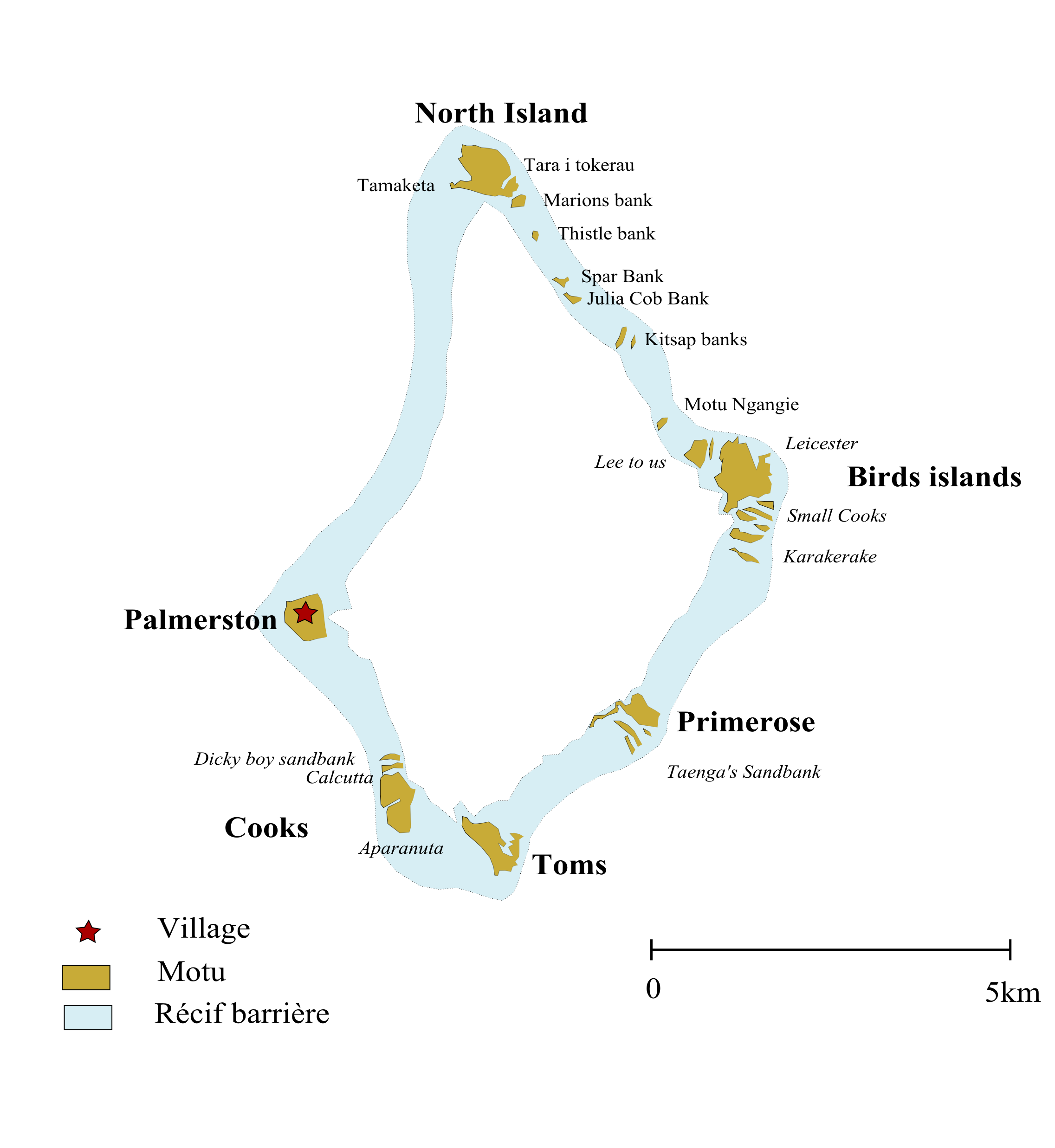
Map of Palmerston

Karakerake is an islet in Palmerston Island in the Cook Islands. it is on the eastern edge of the atoll, between Small Cooks and Primrose. It is named after the family land of Akakaingara, one of William Marsters' three wives, on Penrhyn atoll.
