= Tara i tokerau =

Islet in Cook Island

Coordinates: 17°59′48.06″S 163°9′30.21″W

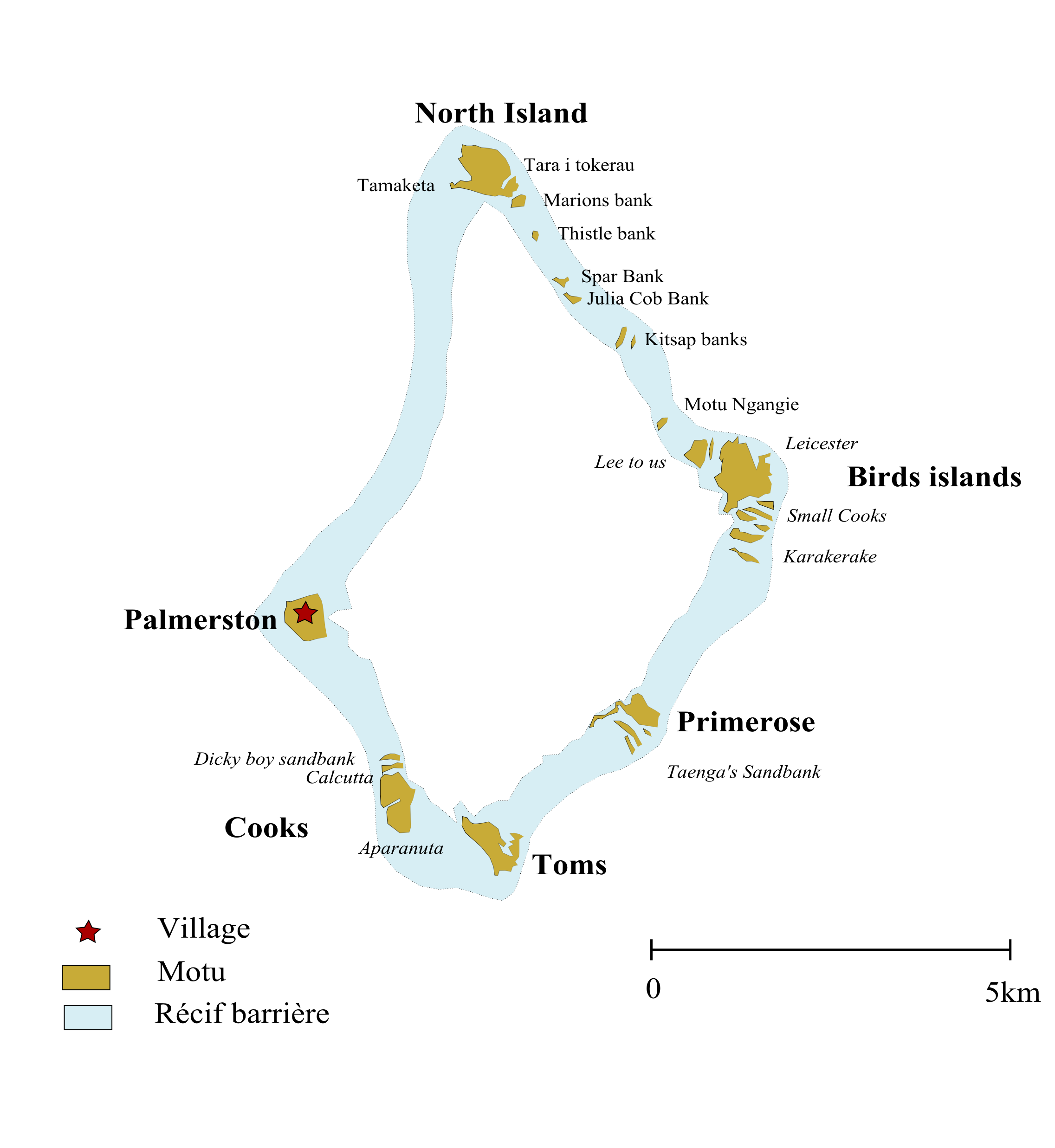
Map of Palmerston

Tara i tokerau ("point of north") is an islet in Palmerston Island in the Cook Islands. The islet is on the north tip of the atoll, between North Island and Marions bank.
