= Leicester (islet) =

Islet in Palmerston Island in the Cook Islands, Pacific Ocean

Coordinates: 18°2′9.21″S 163°7′16.16″W

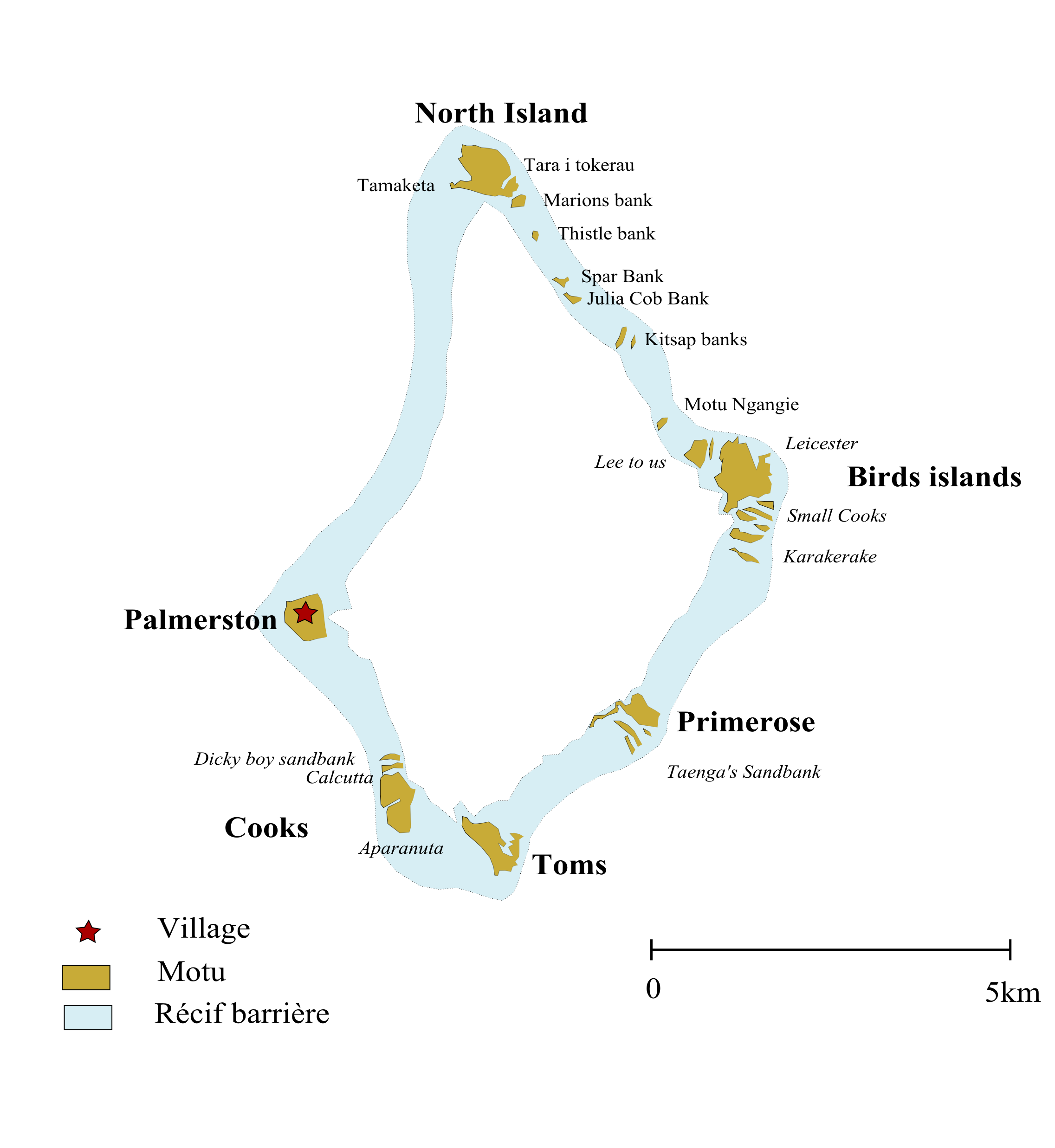
Map of Palmerston

Leicester is an islet in Palmerston Island in the Cook Islands. It is on the east side of the atoll, between Lee To Us and Small Cooks. It is named after William Marsters' probable birthplace of Leicester.
