= Marions bank =

Islet in the Cook Islands

Coordinates: 17°59′55.12″S 163°9′25.73″W

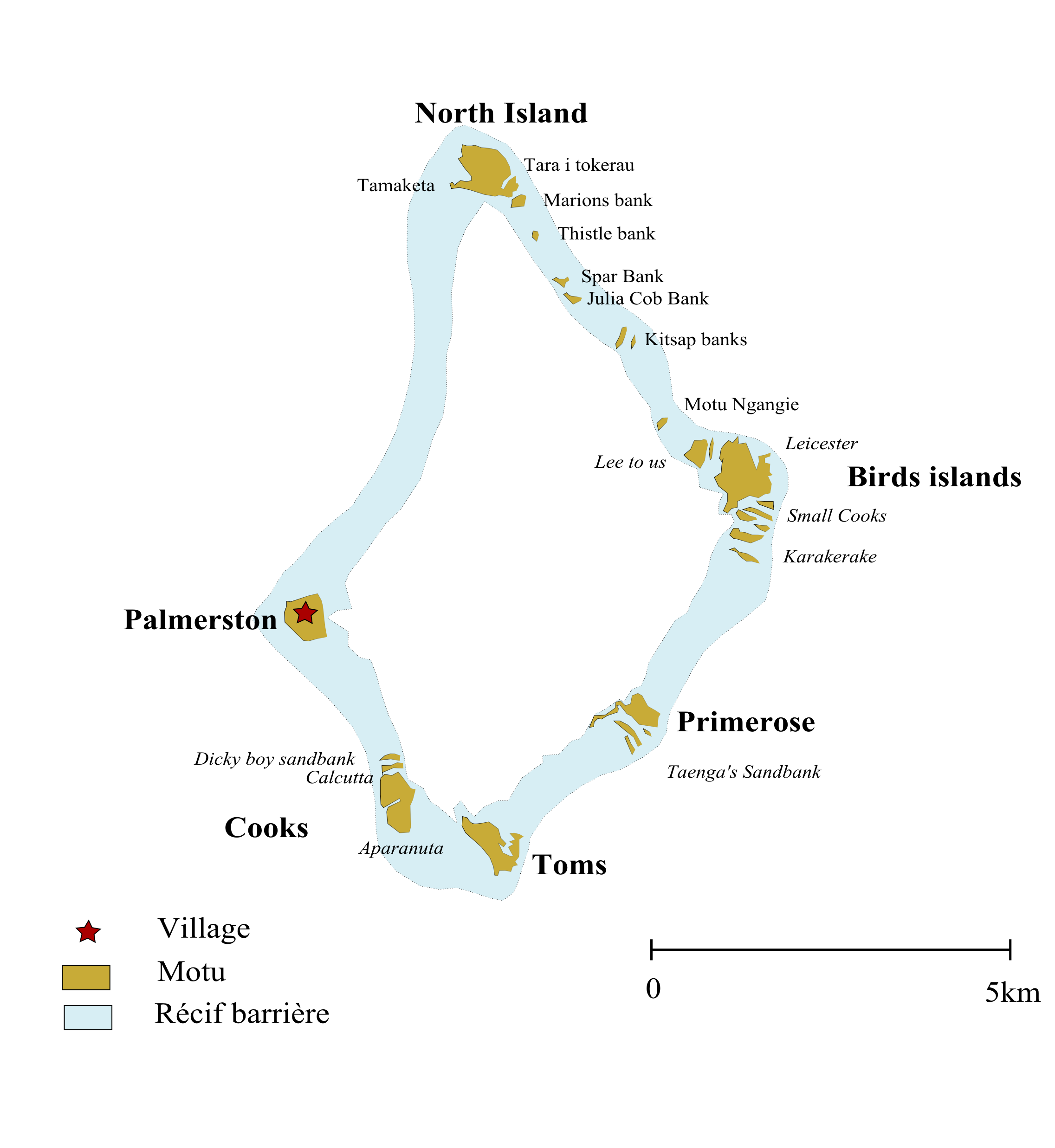
Map of Palmerston

Marions bank is an islet in Palmerston Island in the Cook Islands. It is on the north side of the atoll, between Tara i tokerau and Motu Ngangie. The islet is named after one of the first people born on Palmerston.
