= Scratch My Arse Rock =

Fishing location off the coast of Palmerston Island, Cook Islands

- Islet
- Location within Cook Islands
- Coordinates: 18.050399°S 163.188892°W

Scratch My Arse Rock (also known as Kiss Me Arse Rock or Kick-My-Arse Rock) is an islet—with a coral reef underneath—off the coast of Palmerston Island, an atoll belonging to the Cook Islands archipelago. Named Roche Gratte Fesse by locals, the rock's more widespread names were reputedly created by 19th-century English adventurer of Polynesia, William Marsters, who named it because he itched his anus while at the location. A popular fishing spot, the waters off Scratch My Arse Rock are noted for their abundance of parrotfish.

Geologically, Scratch My Arse Rock is a plateau and composed of granite.

It is noted for its unusual name.

Geographical data for the rock is available from the National Geospatial-Intelligence Agency at Bethesda, Maryland, United States, to be found at Geographical Names.
