= Lee To Us =

Islet in Palmerston Island in the Cook Islands, Pacific Ocean

Coordinates: 18°2′0.82″S 163°7′38.68″W

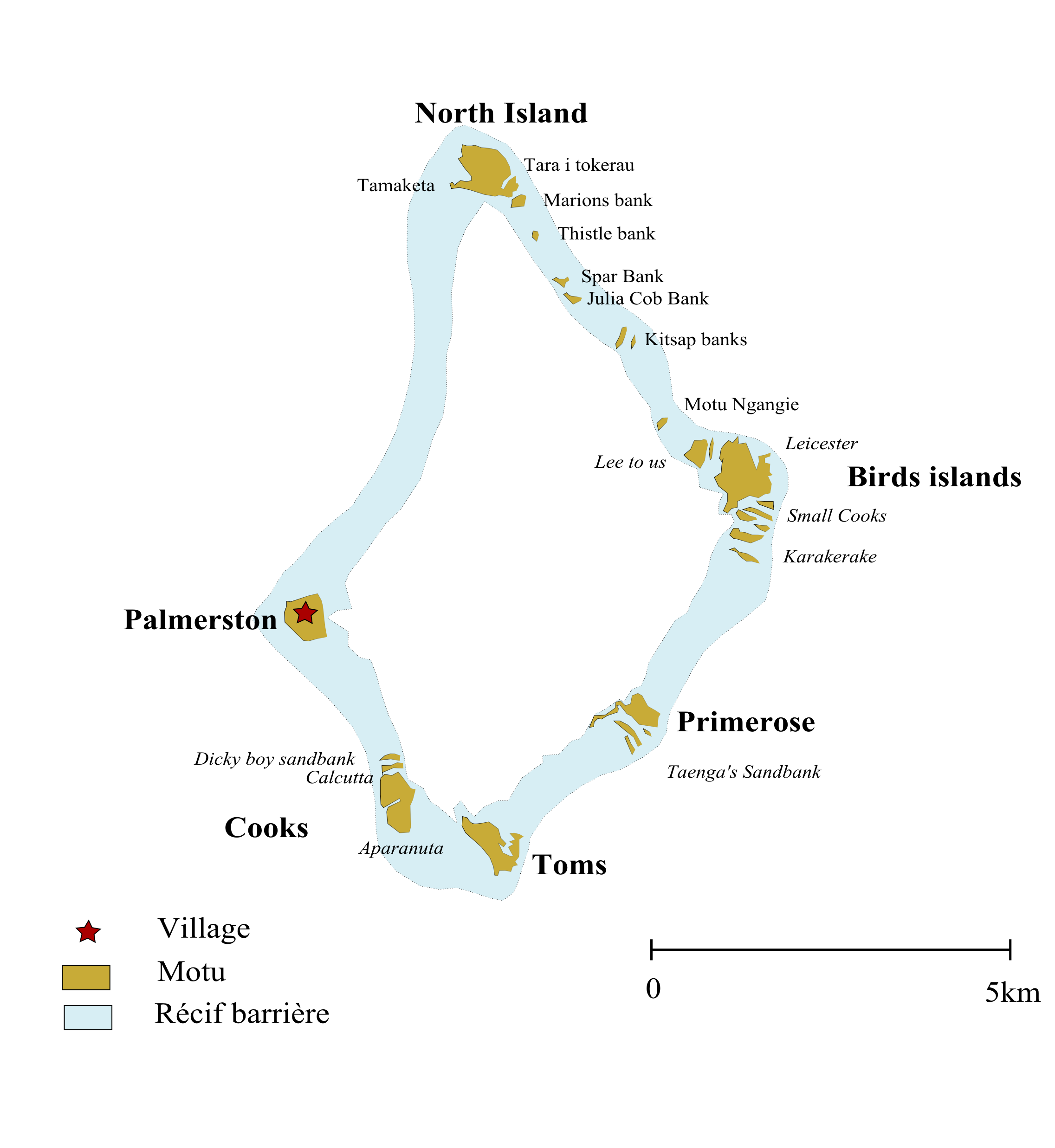
Map of Palmerston

Lee To Us is an islet in Palmerston Island in the Cook Islands. The island is on the east side of the atoll, between Motu Ngangie and Leicester. Its name is a simple physical description.
