= 2013–14 South Pacific cyclone season =

Tropical cyclone season

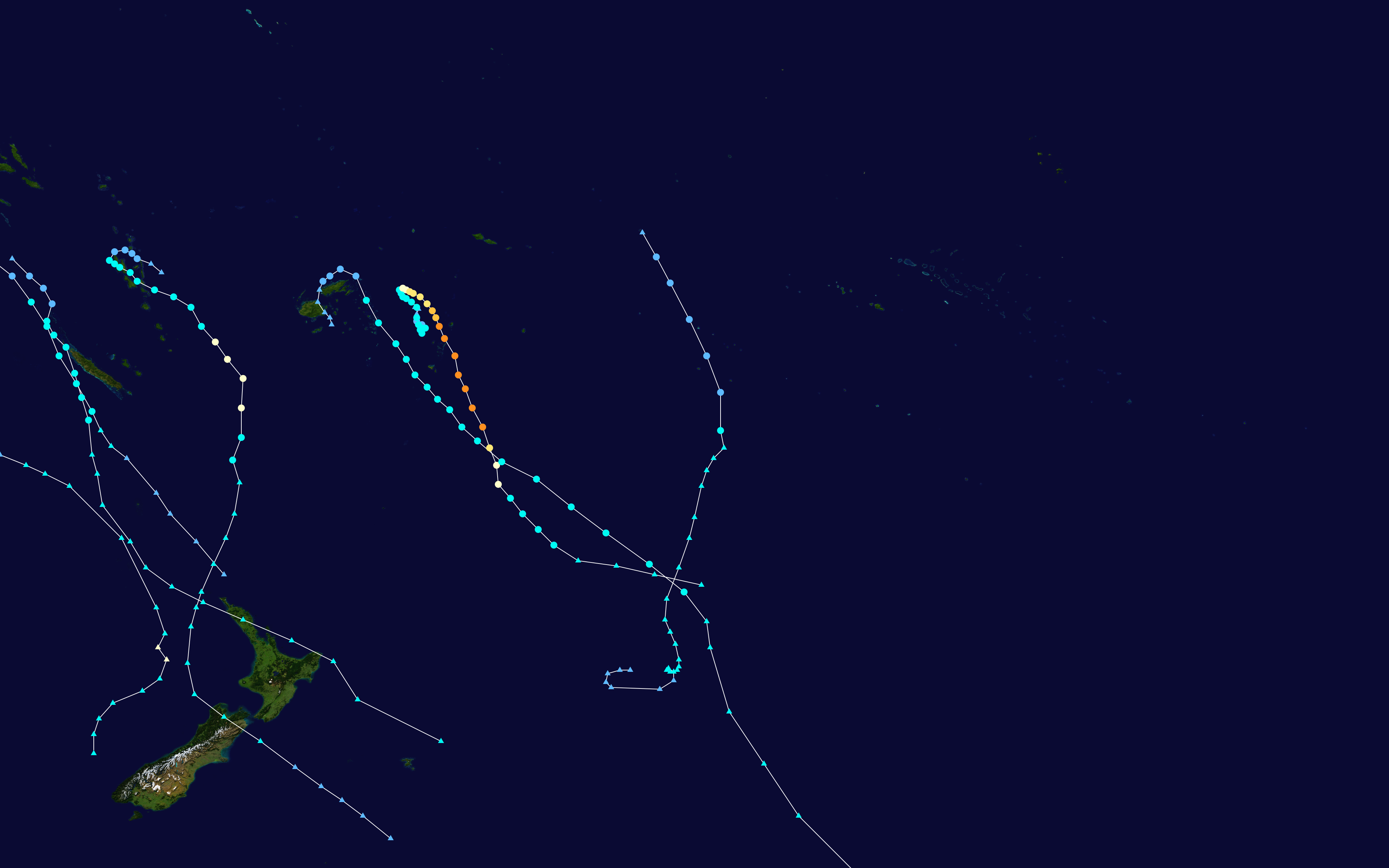
- Season summary map

Seasonal boundaries
- First system formed: October 19, 2013
- Last system dissipated: March 20, 2014

Strongest storm
- Name: Ian
  - Maximum winds: 205 km/h (125 mph) (10-minute sustained)
  - Lowest pressure: 930 hPa (mbar)

Seasonal statistics
- Total disturbances: 20
- Total depressions: 13
- Tropical cyclones: 6
- Severe tropical cyclones: 2
- Total fatalities: 12 total
- Total damage: $48 million (2014 USD)

Related articles
- 2013–14 Australian region cyclone season; 2013–14 South-West Indian Ocean cyclone season

The 2013–14 South Pacific cyclone season was a slightly below average tropical cyclone season, with six tropical cyclones occurring within the basin between 160°E and 120°W. The season ran from November 1, 2013, to April 30, 2014, however, the first four tropical disturbances occurred during October 2013 and were included as a part of the season. During the season, tropical cyclones were officially monitored by the Fiji Meteorological Service (FMS), Australian Bureau of Meteorology (BoM) and New Zealand's MetService. The United States Joint Typhoon Warning Center (JTWC) and other national meteorological services including Météo-France and NOAA also monitored the basin during the season. During the season there were 21 significant tropical disturbances were assigned a number and an "F" suffix by the FMS's Regional Specialized Meteorological Center in Nadi, Fiji (RSMC Nadi), including the remnants of Tropical Cyclone Hadi from the Australian region. The BoM, MetService and RSMC Nadi all estimated sustained wind speeds over a period of 10-minutes and used the Australian tropical cyclone intensity scale, while the JTWC estimated sustained winds over a 1-minute period, which are subsequently compared to the Saffir–Simpson hurricane wind scale (SSHS).

== Seasonal forecasts ==
Source/Record	Tropical Cyclone	Severe Tropical Cyclone	Ref
Record high:	1997–98: 16	1982–83:10
Record low:	2011–12: 3	2008–09: 0
Average (1969–70 – 2012–13):	7.4	—
RSMC Nadi	4–8	2–4
NIWA	8–12	4
Actual	6	2
Region	Chance of above average activity	Average number	Actual activity
Southern Pacific	48%	15	8
Western South Pacific	56%	8	4
Eastern South Pacific	47%	11	4
Source:BOM's Seasonal Outlooks for Tropical Cyclones.

Ahead of the cyclone season, the BoM, the FMS, MetService, the New Zealand National Institute of Water and Atmospheric Research (NIWA) and various other Pacific Meteorological services, all contributed towards the Island Climate Update tropical cyclone outlook that was released during October 2013. The outlook took into account the ENSO neutral conditions that had been observed across the Pacific and analogue seasons that had ENSO neutral conditions occurring during the season. The outlook called for a near average number of tropical cyclones for the 2013–14 season, with eight to twelve named tropical cyclones, to occur between 135°E and 120°W compared to an average of 10. At least four of the tropical cyclones were expected to become category 3 severe tropical cyclones, while three could become category 4 severe tropical cyclones, they also noted that a Category 5 severe tropical cyclone was unlikely to occur. In addition to contributing towards the Island Climate Update outlook, the FMS and the BoM both issued their own seasonal forecasts for the South Pacific region.

The BoM issued 3 seasonal forecasts for the South Pacific region between 142.5°E and 120°W, one for the Western Southern Pacific region between 142.5°E and 165°E and one for the Eastern Southern Pacific region between 165°E and 120°W. They noted that the tropical Pacific Ocean was currently experiencing neutral ENSO conditions which meant that there was no strong shift expected in the average location of tropical cyclone formation. They also noted that there was nothing in the broad climate drivers to suggest anything, but a typical tropical cyclone season for the South Pacific region. As a result, they predicted that the South Pacific region as a whole, would experience near average tropical cyclone activity during the coming season with a 48% chance of it being above average. The Western region was predicted to have 56% chance of being above average while the Eastern region had a 47% chance of being above average. Within their outlook the FMS predicted that between four and eight tropical cyclones, would occur within the basin compared to an average of around 7.4 cyclones. At least two of the tropical cyclones were expected to become category 3 severe tropical cyclones, while 1–2 might intensify into a category 4 or 5 severe tropical cyclones. They also reported that the tropical cyclone genesis trough was expected to be located near to and to the west of the International Date Line. This was based on the expected and predicted ENSO conditions, and the existence of the Pacific warm pool of sub-surface temperature anomalies in this region.

The FMS and Island Climate Update tropical cyclone outlooks both assessed, the risk of a tropical cyclone affecting a certain island or territory. As the tropical cyclone genesis trough of low pressure was expected to be located near to and to the west of the International Date Line, normal or slightly above normal activity was expected for areas near the dateline. It was also predicted that activity between Vanuatu and New Caledonia, as well as east of the International Date Line to be normal or below normal during the season. The Island Climate Update Outlook predicted that Vanuatu and New Caledonia had a reduced chance of being affected by multiple tropical cyclones. The Cook Islands, Fiji, Papua New Guinea, Tuvalu, Tokelau, Samoan Islands, Solomon Islands, Tonga, Wallis and Futuna and French Polynesia's Austral and Society Islands were all predicted to have a normal chance of being affected by a tropical cyclone. Niue and New Zealand were predicted to face an elevated risk while French Polynesia's Tuamotu Archipelago and Marquesas Islands, Kiribati and the Pitcairn Islands, had an unlikely chance of being affected by a tropical cyclone. The FMS outlook predicted that the Cook and Samoan Islands, Tokelau and Niue had a below average risk of being affected by a tropical cyclone. The Solomon Islands, Wallis and Futuna, Vanuatu and Tonga were predicted to face an average risk of being affected by a tropical cyclone. New Caledonia, Tuvalu and Fiji were predicted to face an above average chance of being affected by a tropical cyclone. The FMS also predicted that there was an increased risk of severe tropical cyclones, affecting the region this year when compared to the previous season. There was a very high risk of Wallis and Futuna, Tonga, Fiji and New Caledonia being affected by a severe tropical cyclone. The Samoan Islands, Tokelau, Niue, Solomon Islands and Vanuatu had a high risk, while the Cook Islands had a low to moderate risk of being affected by a severe tropical cyclone.

== Seasonal summary ==
Ahead of the season formally starting on November 1, 2013, three tropical depressions and a tropical disturbance developed, within the Coral Sea during October. Tropical Disturbance 01F developed on October 19, to the southeast of the Solomon Islands and moved westwards, as a small compact system before it was last noted during the next day. Tropical Depression 02F was first noted on October 19, to the northeast of Suva, Fiji, over the next couple of days the system rapidly consolidated further. However, despite having a good chance of developing into a tropical cyclone, atmospheric convection surrounding the system failed to consolidate enough. The system was subsequently last noted on October 26, as it moved through the island nation of Vanuatu. Tropical Depression 03F was briefly noted on October 22, to the northeast of Honiara on the Solomon Island of Guadalcanal. Tropical Depression 04F developed on October 25, to the southeast of Honiara and affected the islands before RSMC Nadi issued its final advisory on the system during October 27, as it was not expected to develop into a tropical cyclone.

== Systems ==
=== Tropical Depression 02F ===
- Tropical depression (Australian scale)
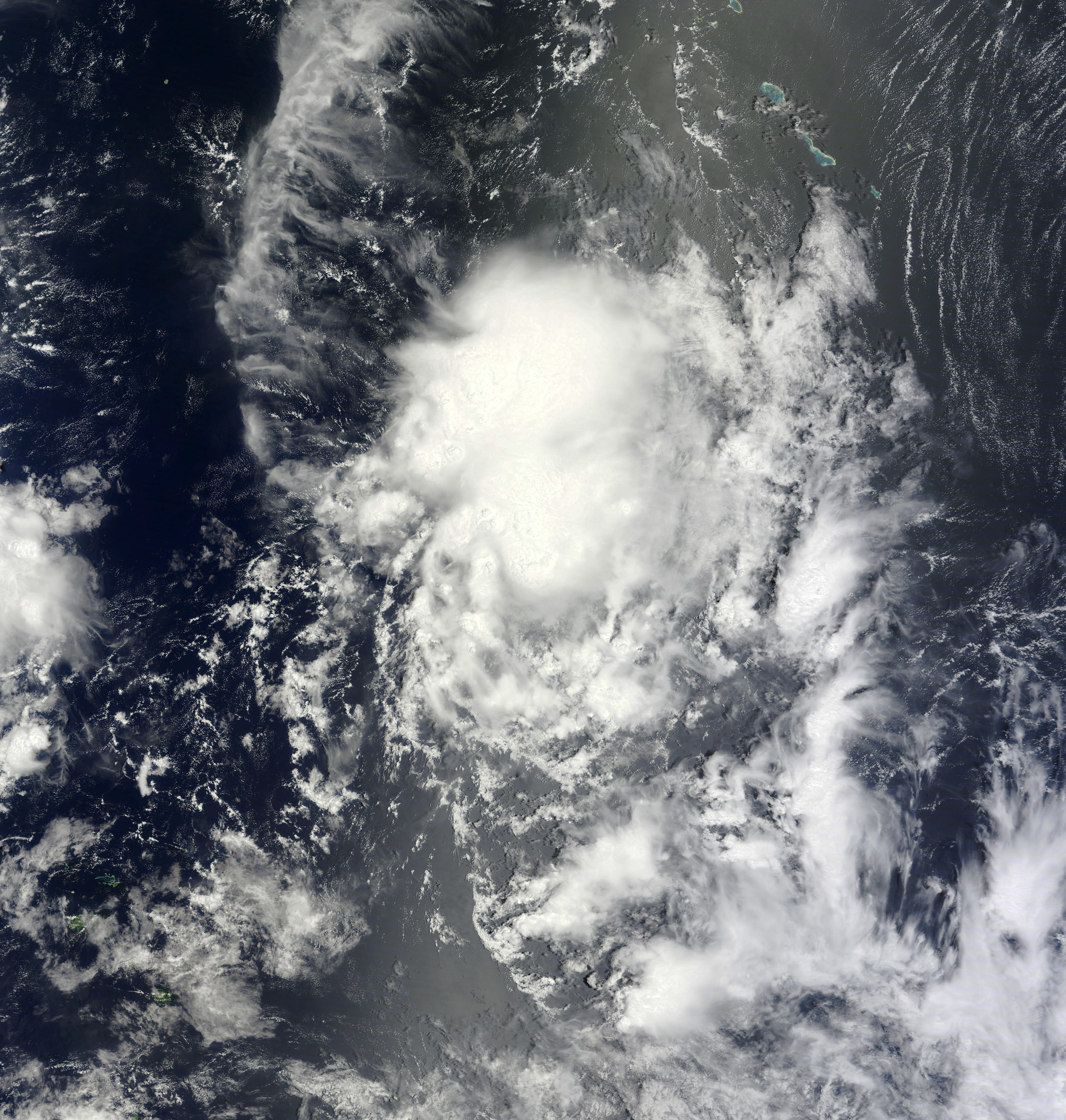
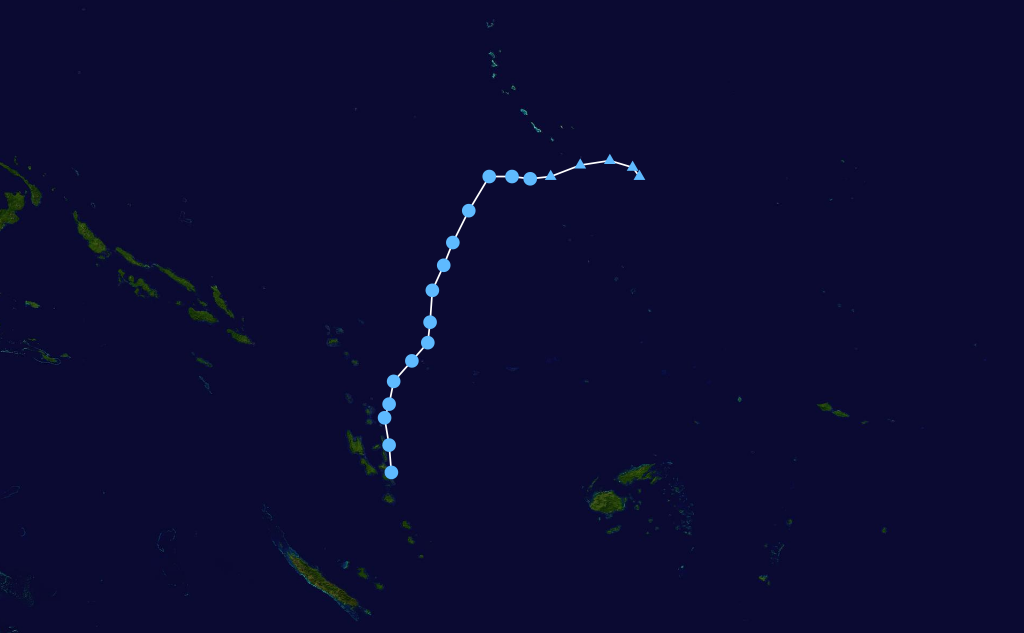
- Duration: October 19 – October 23
- Peak intensity: Winds not specified; 1002 hPa (mbar)

Early on October 19, RSMC Nadi reported that Tropical Disturbance 02F had developed, about 1,550 km (965 mi) to the northeast of Suva, Fiji. Over the next day the system moved westwards within an area of low vertical wind shear and rapidly consolidated further and became a tropical depression during October 20. After the system had started to move towards the south-southwest and continued to consolidate, the Joint Typhoon Warning Center issued a Tropical Cyclone Formation Alert for the system during October 21. However, this alert was cancelled during the next day after satellite imagery revealed a poorly defined low level circulation center, with unorganized atmospheric convection that had not consolidated and vertical wind shear over the system had started to increase. RSMC Nadi subsequently issued their final warning on the system during October 23, as the system weakened into an area of low pressure over the islands of Vanuatu. However, the remnant area of low pressure was monitored until October 26, as it moved through Vanuatu.

Between October 23–24, heavy rainfall associated with the system, caused flooding and landslides on the island of Paama in Malampa Province. Because of the islands geography, impacts were reported to most villages on the island with specific damage reported to homes, roads, a school and the islands air strip. Other impacts included over 160 food gardens being destroyed and the ground water supply was contaminated.

=== Severe Tropical Cyclone Ian ===
- Category 5 severe tropical cyclone (Australian scale)
- Category 4 tropical cyclone (SSHWS)
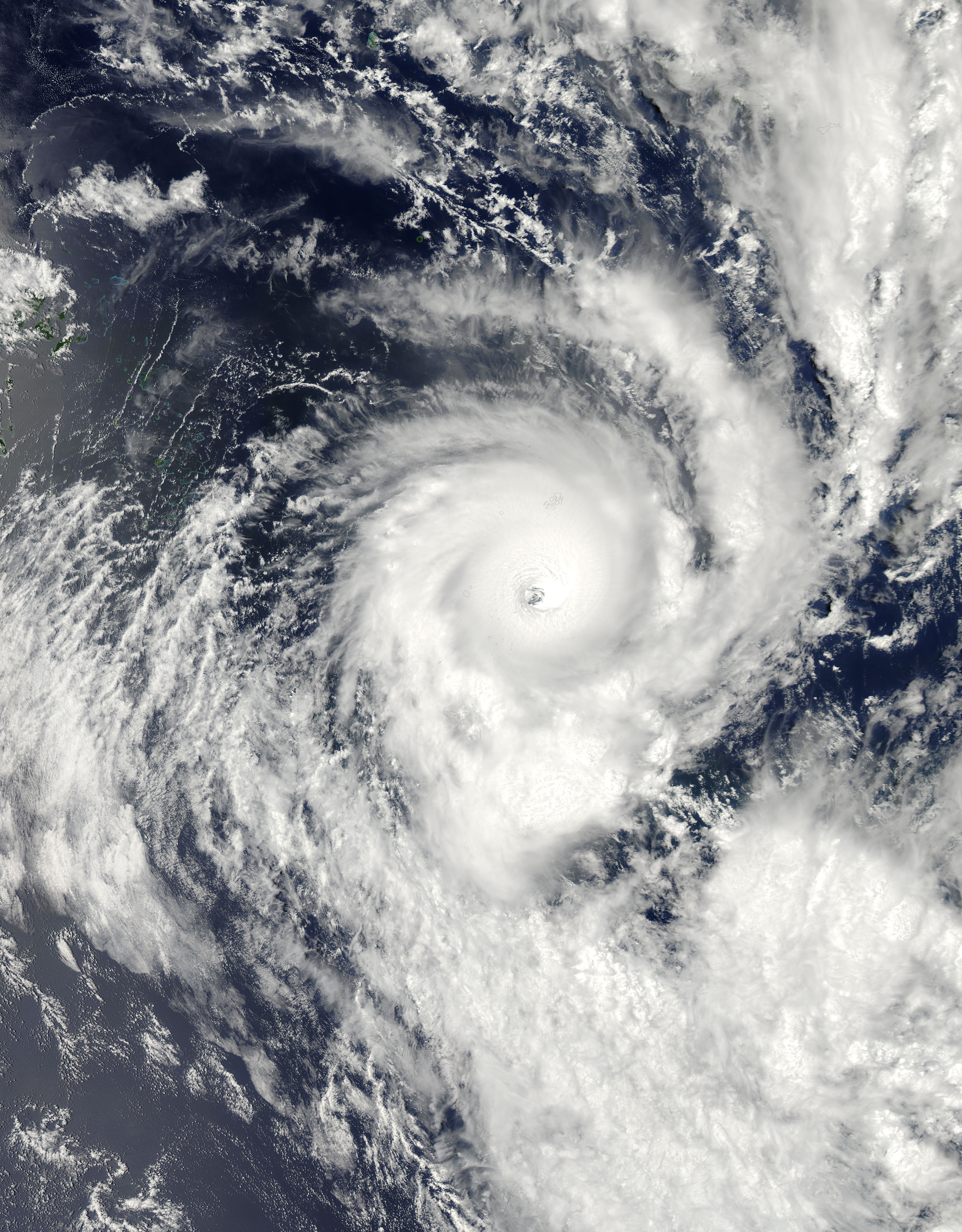
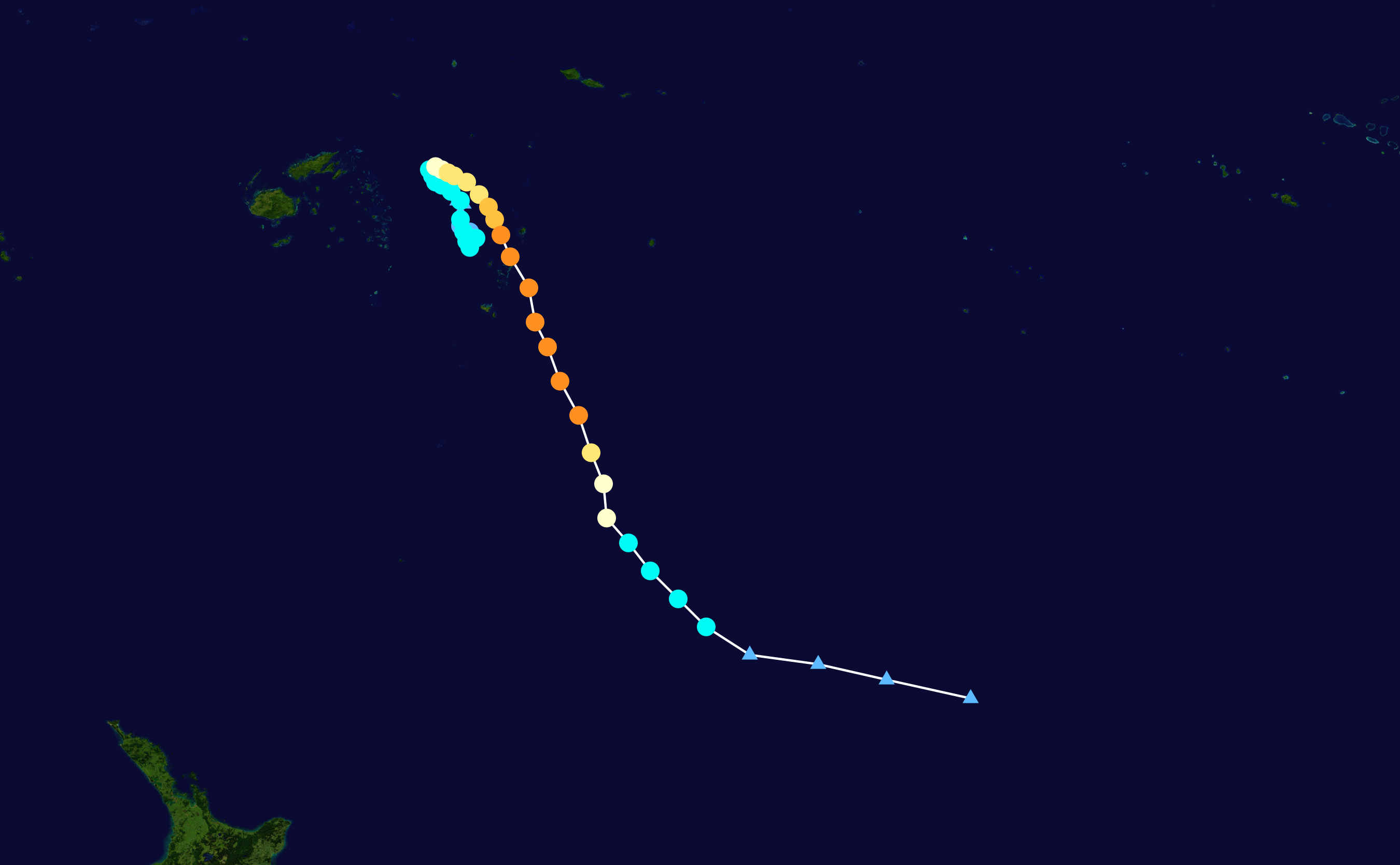
- Duration: January 2 – January 14
- Peak intensity: 205 km/h (125 mph) (10-min); 930 hPa (mbar)

During January 2, RSMC Nadi reported that Tropical Disturbance 07F had developed to the southeast of Futuna Island. Over the next three days the system gradually developed further underneath an upper-level ridge of high pressure, within an area of moderate vertical wind shear, as it slowly moved towards the southwest. Late on January 5, the JTWC designated the system as Tropical Cyclone 07P, before RSMC Nadi named the system Ian, after it had become a category 1 tropical cyclone on the Australian scale.

=== Tropical Cyclone June ===
- Category 1 tropical cyclone (Australian scale)
- Tropical storm (SSHWS)
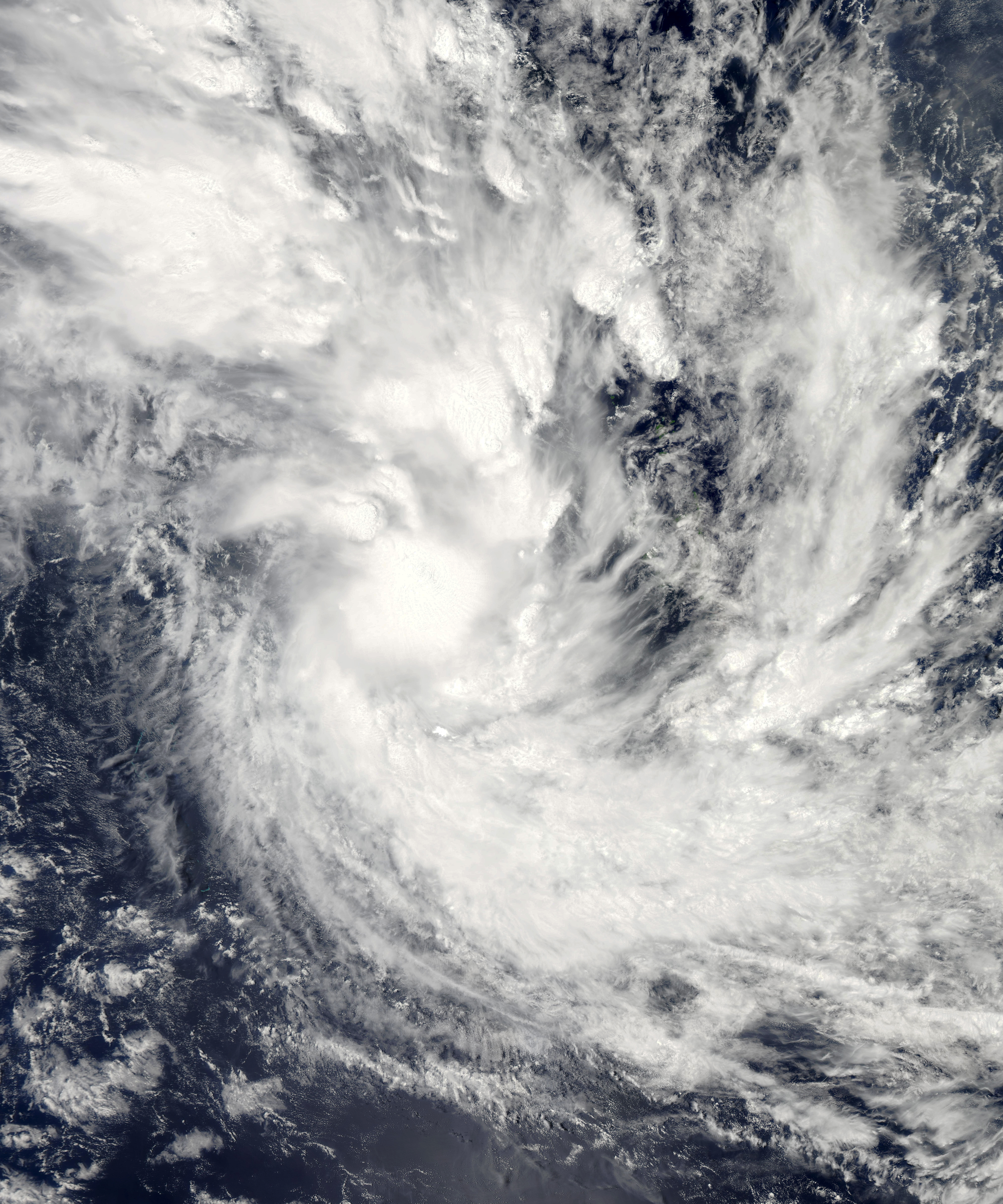
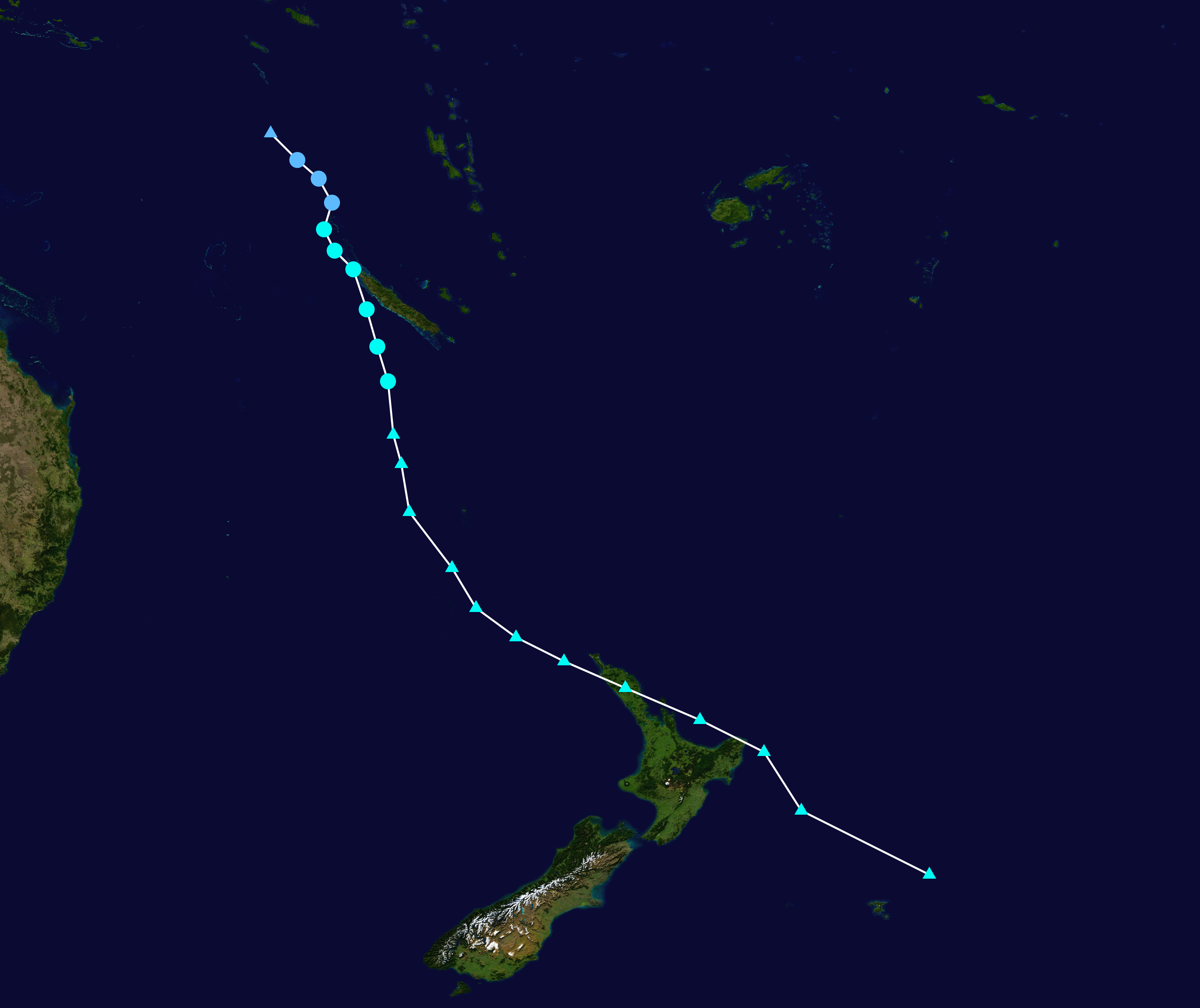
- Duration: January 13 – January 19
- Peak intensity: 75 km/h (45 mph) (10-min); 990 hPa (mbar)

During January 13, the FMS reported that Tropical Disturbance 08F had developed, along a surface trough of low pressure to the southeast of the Solomon Island Makira. Over the next couple of days the system moved south-westwards and moved into the Australian region during January 15, where it was classified as a monsoonal low. The disturbance, however, exited that basin on January 16 without upgrading it to a tropical cyclone. The RSMC Nadi had reported that the system intensified into a Category 1 tropical cyclone and was named June the next day.

June caused at least one fatality in New Caledonia, possibly two.

=== Tropical Cyclone Edna ===
- Category 2 tropical cyclone (Australian scale)
- Tropical storm (SSHWS)
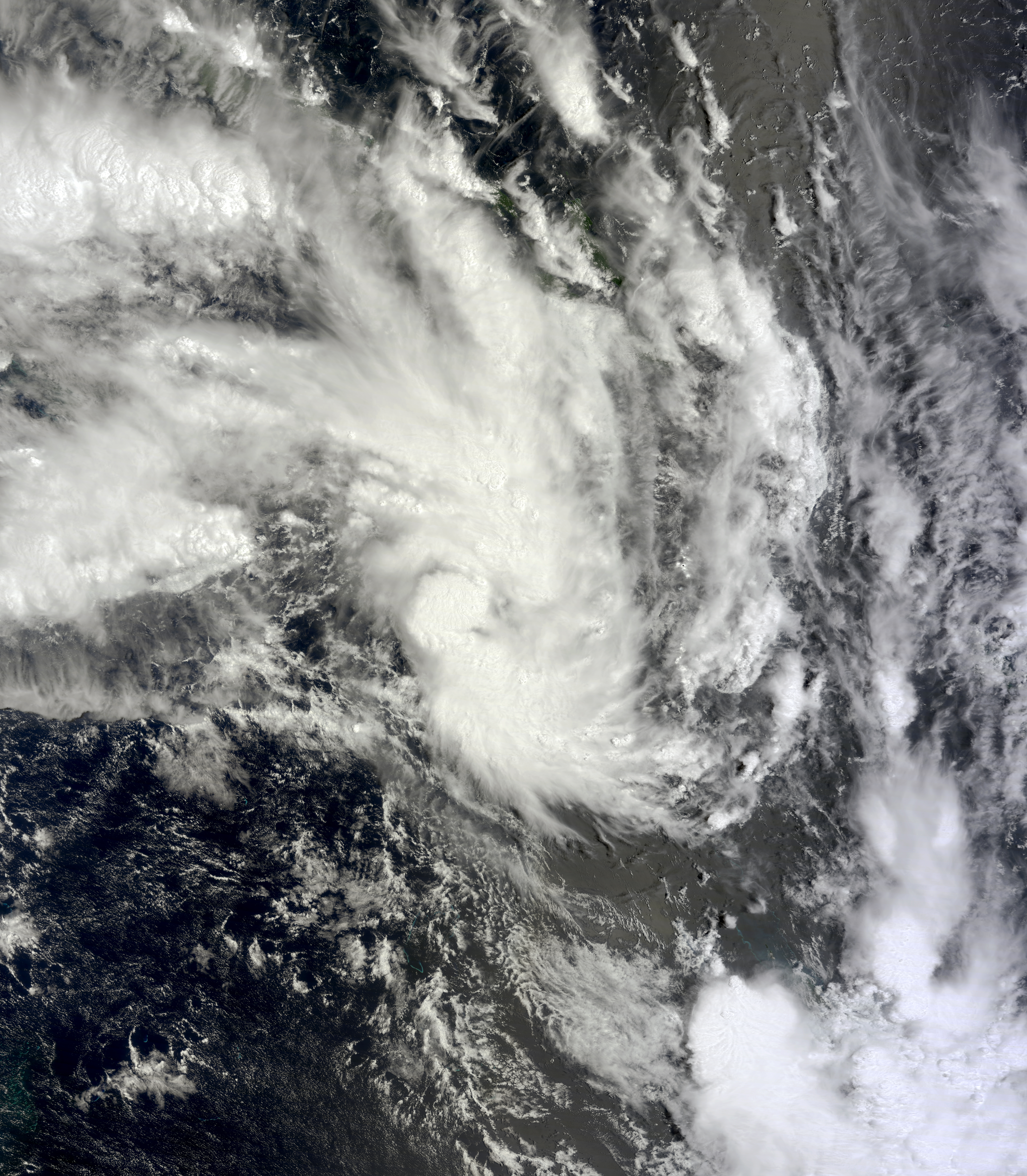
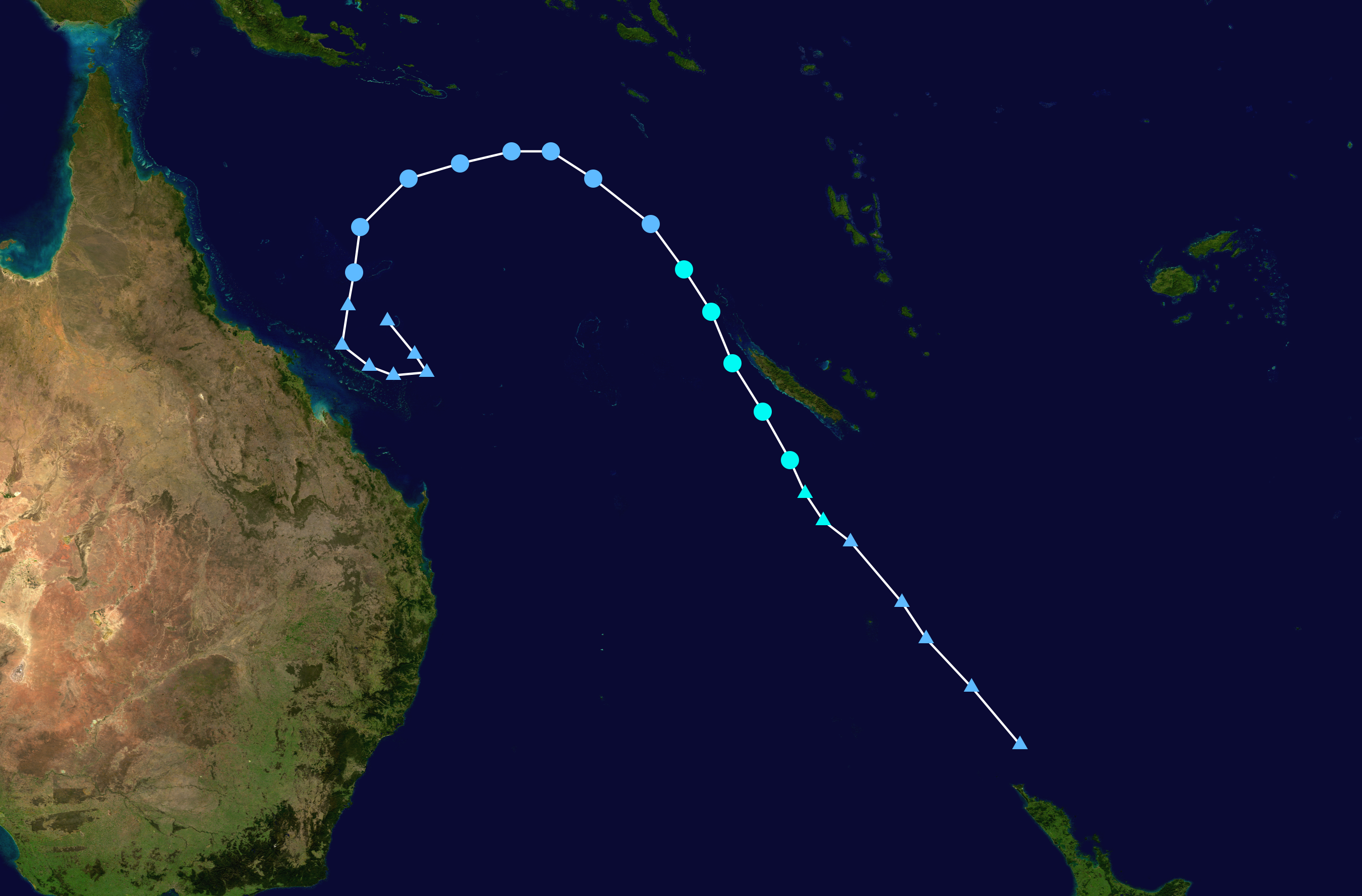
- Duration: February 4 (Entered basin) – February 6
- Peak intensity: 95 km/h (60 mph) (10-min); 985 hPa (mbar)

During February 4, Tropical Cyclone Edna moved into the basin, just after deep convection surrounding the system had significantly improved and it had re-intensified into a tropical cyclone. Over the next day the system was steered to the south-southeast by a mid-level ridge of high pressure and affected the French Territory of New Caledonia. Both RSMC Nadi and JTWC subsequently estimated that the system had reached its peak sustained winds of 90 km/h (55 mph), which made it a category 2 tropical cyclone on the Australian scale.

=== Tropical Cyclone Kofi ===
- Category 2 tropical cyclone (Australian scale)
- Tropical storm (SSHWS)
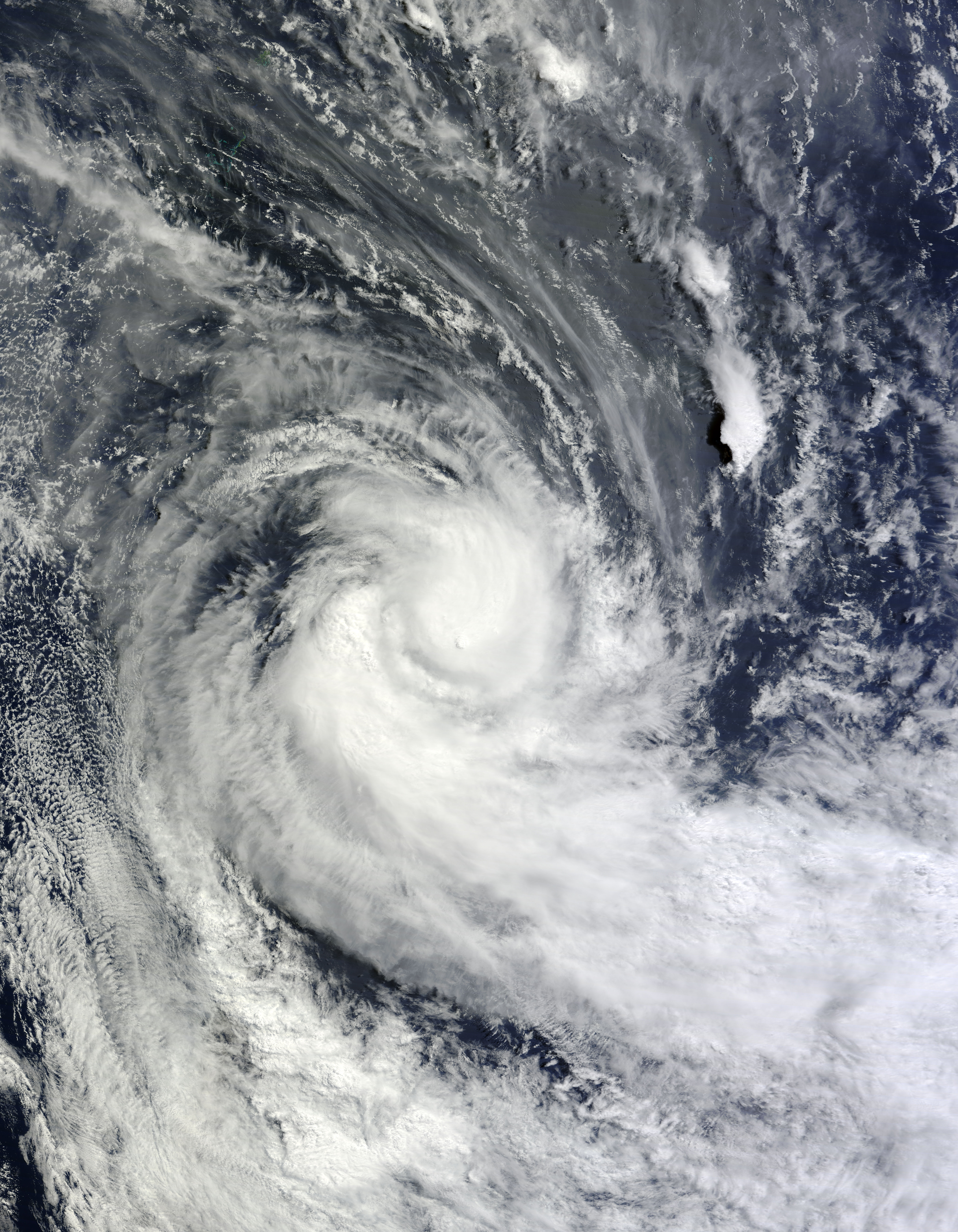
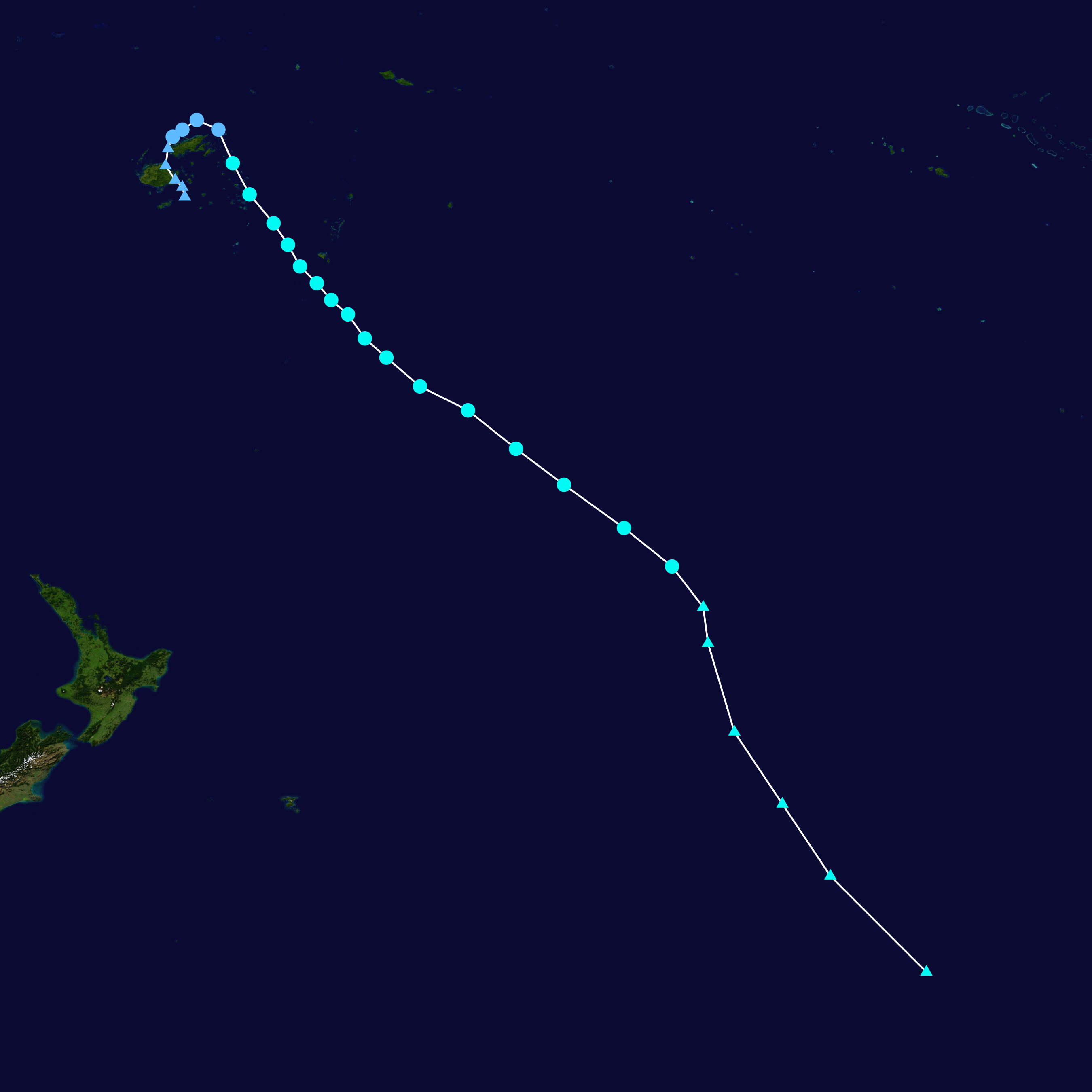
- Duration: February 24 – March 4
- Peak intensity: 100 km/h (65 mph) (10-min); 980 hPa (mbar)

On February 24, RSMC Nadi reported that Tropical Depression 15F had developed about 265 km (165 mi) west of Nadi, Fiji. This was quite close to Tropical Depression 14F, and JTWC appear to have regarded them as the same system. There had also been severe flooding in Central and Eastern parts of Fiji Islands on February 27. During Kofi's duration, the system submerged many homes in the Fiji Islands.

The strengthened to Category 1 as it approached Tonga on 1 March, causing sea flooding but no major damage.

=== Severe Tropical Cyclone Lusi ===
- Category 3 severe tropical cyclone (Australian scale)
- Category 1 tropical cyclone (SSHWS)
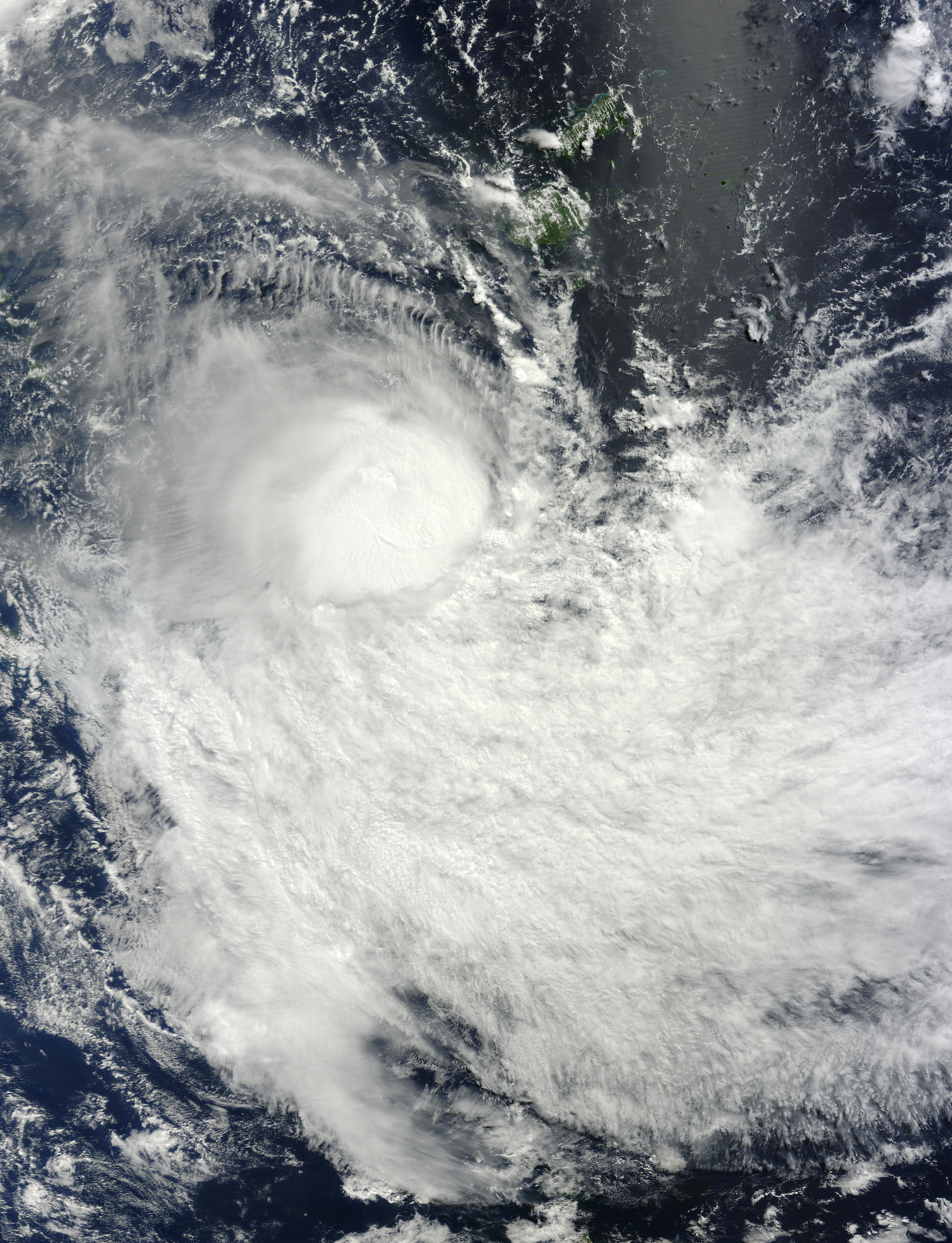
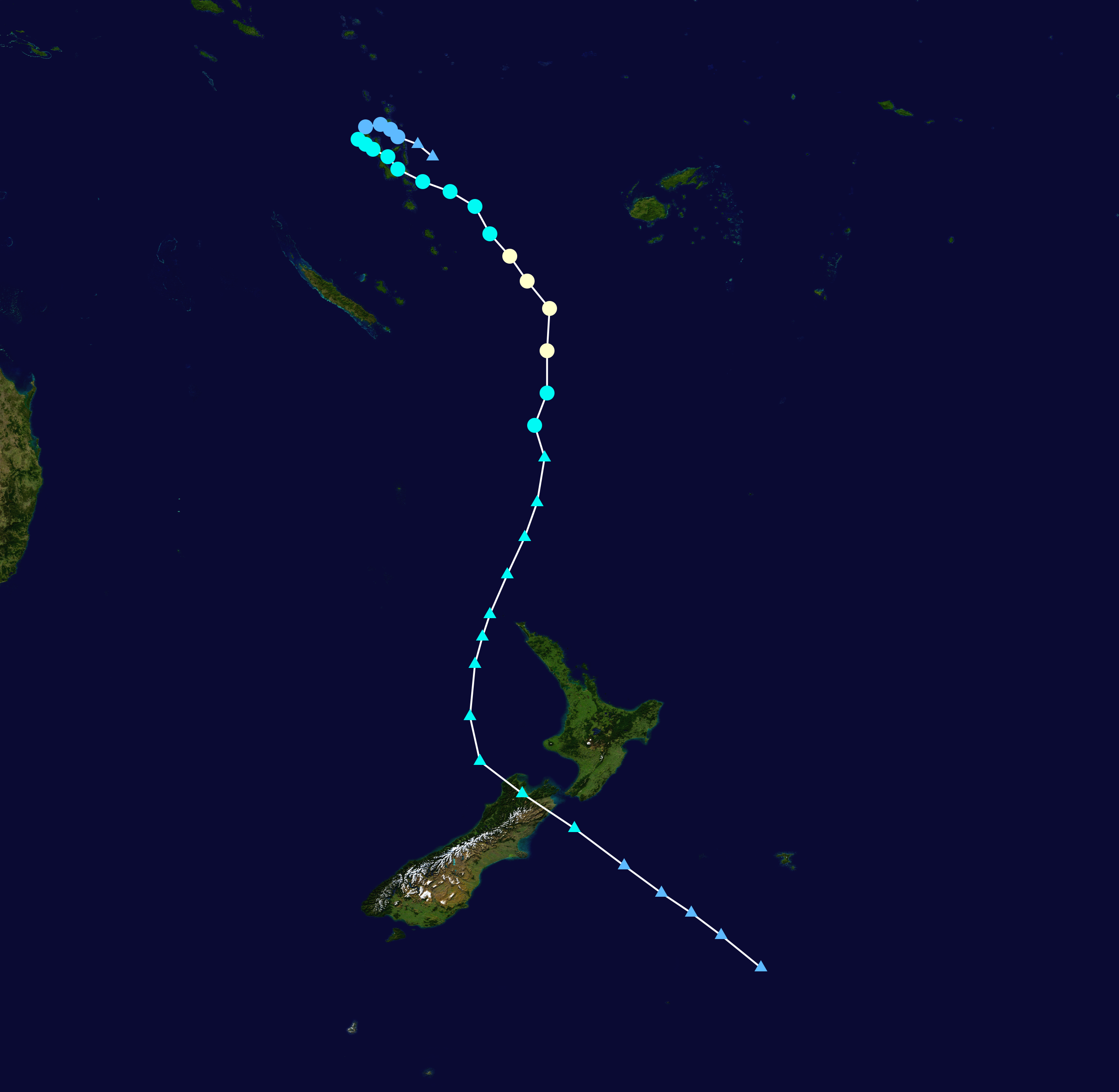
- Duration: March 7 – March 14
- Peak intensity: 150 km/h (90 mph) (10-min); 960 hPa (mbar)

Early on March 7, RSMC Nadi reported that Tropical Disturbance 18F had developed about 685 km (425 mi) to the west of Nadi, Fiji. Over the next two days the system moved towards the north-northwest and slowly consolidated, as atmospheric convection wrapped into the systems low level circulation center, before RSMC Nadi reported during March 9, that the system had developed into a tropical depression. It later strengthened into a category 1 tropical cyclone. The system killed 10 people in Vanuatu and damaged or destroyed 40 structures. The remnants of the system impacted New Zealand, causing NZ$4 million of damage.

=== Tropical Cyclone Mike ===
- Category 1 tropical cyclone (Australian scale)
- Tropical storm (SSHWS)
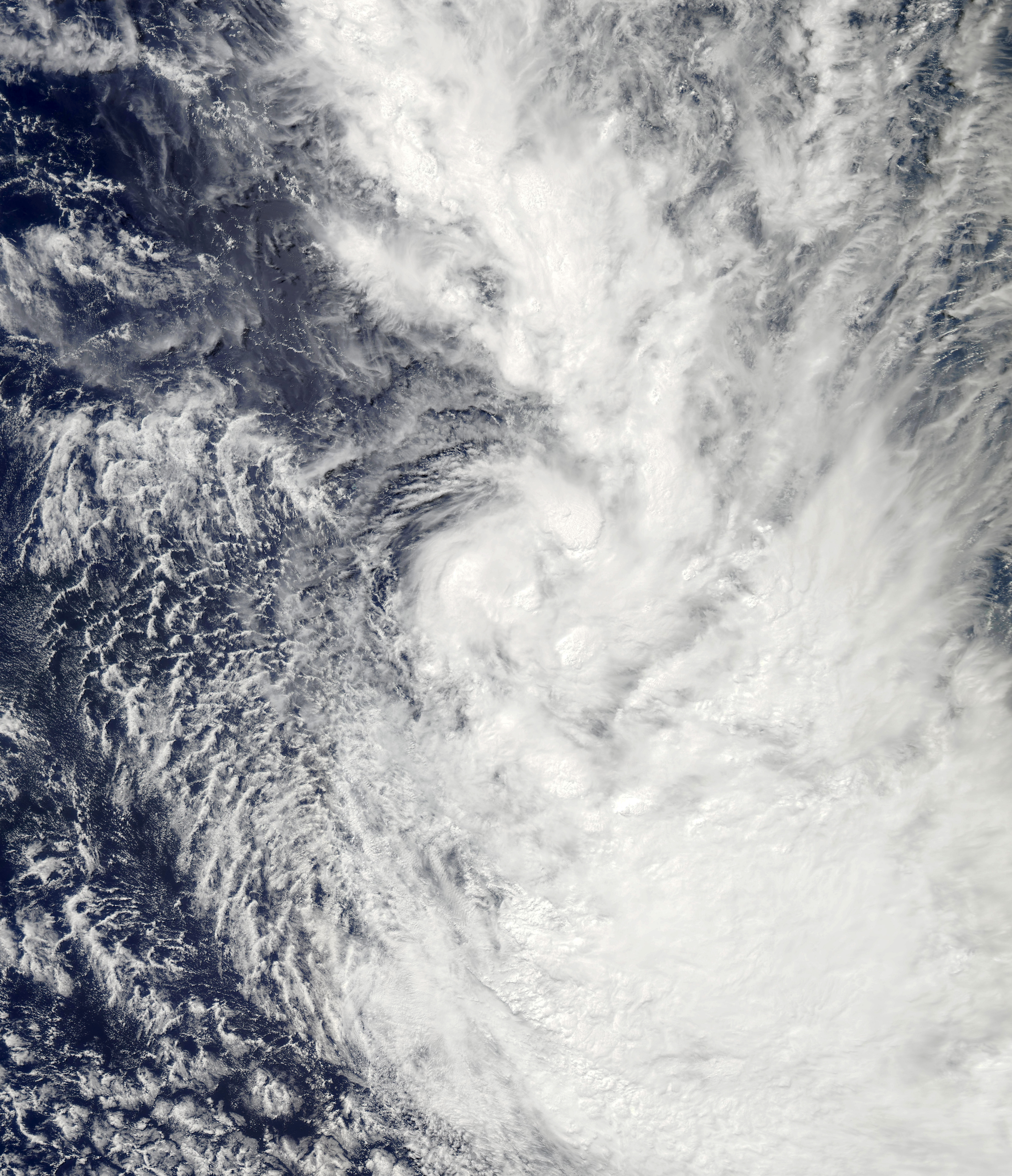
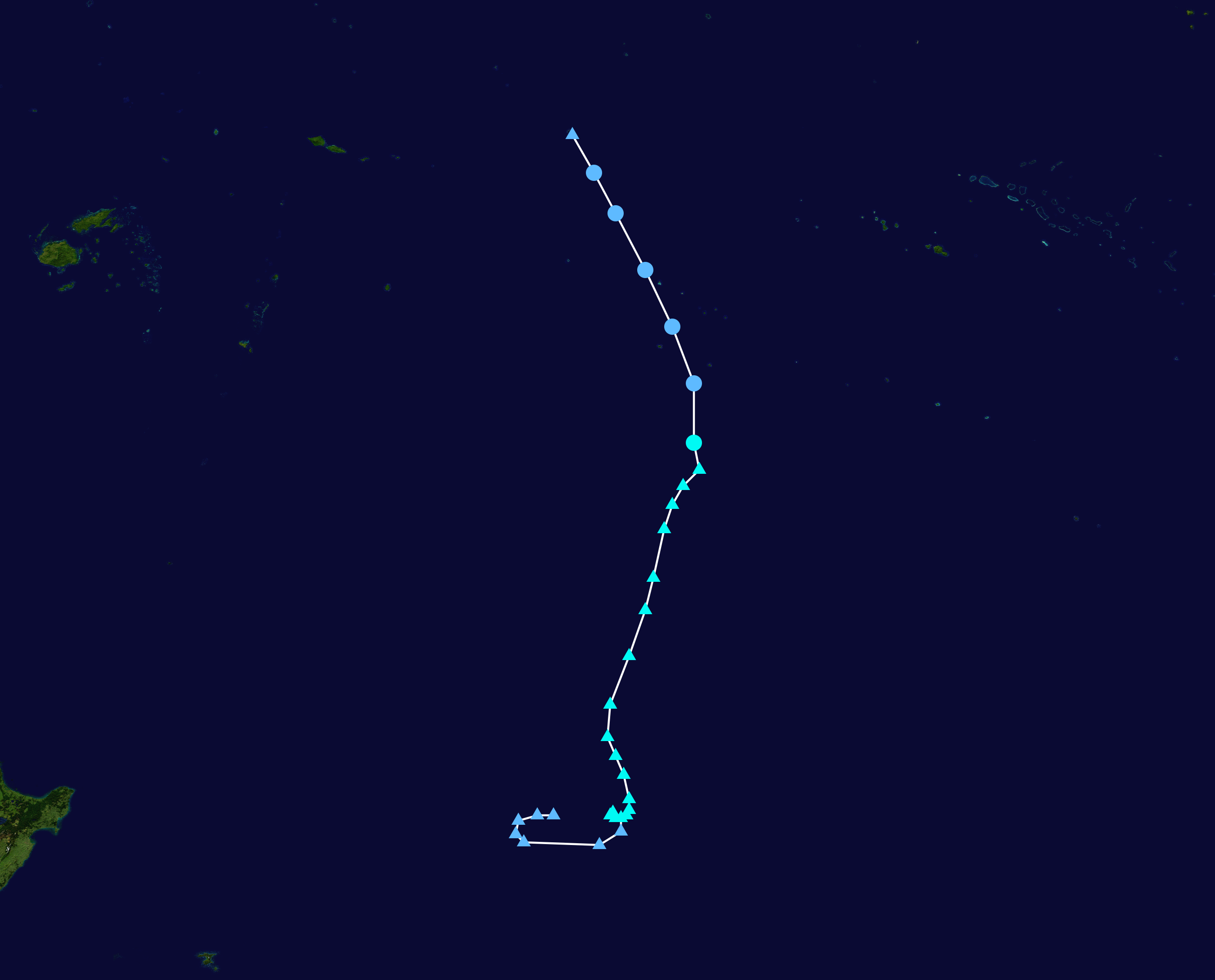
- Duration: March 12 – March 20
- Peak intensity: 65 km/h (40 mph) (10-min); 990 hPa (mbar)

On March 12, RSMC Nadi reported that Tropical Disturbance 19F had developed about 250 km (155 mi) to the southeast of Pago Pago, American Samoa. Over the next few days the system gradually developed further before early on March 19, RSMC Nadi reported the system had become a category 1 tropical cyclone on the Australian scale and named it Mike. The JTWC subsequently initiated advisories on the system and assigned it the designation Tropical Cyclone 20P. Later that day RSMC Nadi and the JTWC issued their final advisories on Mike, as it moved below 25S and transitioned into an extratropical cyclone. The extra-tropical remnants of the cyclone were subsequently monitored by TCWC Wellington, until they were last noted during March 24, while they were located over 1,700 km (1,055 mi) to the east of Wellington, New Zealand.

=== Other systems ===
The first numbered tropical disturbance of the year developed within an area of low vertical wind shear, to the southeast of the Solomon Islands on October 19. The system subsequently moved westwards as a small compact system, before it was during October 20 as it dissipated to the north of Vanuatu. During the following day Tropical Disturbance 03F developed within an area of low shear, about 265 km (165 mi) to the northeast of Honiara on Guadalcanal in the Solomon Islands. The system was last noted during October 22, after convection surrounding the centre had significantly reduced. On October 25, the FMS reported that Tropical Depression 04F had developed under an upper-level ridge of high pressure within an area of low windshear, about 330 km (205 mi) to the southeast of Honiara. Over the next couple of days the system affected the Solomon Islands, before it was last noted during October 27, as it was not expected to develop into a Category 1 tropical cyclone. A reanalysis of these three systems was performed by Steve Young during April 2014, who felt that these three systems represented one weak system that existed between October 18–27, near the Solomon Islands.

On December 9, RSMC Nadi reported that Tropical Disturbance 05F had developed to the east of an upper-level trough, in an area of moderate to high vertical windshear about 500 km (310 mi) to the northeast of Nadi, Fiji. During that day the system moved towards the southeast and passed over the Fijian island of Viti Levu. After passing over Fiji the system continued to move south-eastwards and developed into a tropical depression during December 11. During December 12, the system passed about 30 km (20 mi) to the south of Tongatapu Island, before RSMC Nadi issued its final advisory on the system during the next day, as the system was not expected to develop into a tropical cyclone. On December 23, RSMC Nadi reported that Tropical Disturbance 06F had developed under an upper-level ridge of high pressure, within an area of moderate vertical wind shear to the northeast of the Santa Cruz Islands. Over the next few days the system moved south-eastwards and influenced the "moist easterly wind flow" over the Fijian Islands until it was last noted during December 29.

Late on January 21, RSMC Nadi reported that Tropical Depression 09F had developed about 340 km (210 mi) to the southwest of the Cook Island: Palmerston. Over the next day the system moved westwards and developed into a tropical depression, while located within an area of low to moderate vertical windshear. Over the next couple of days the JTWC also monitored the system as a subtropical system that was becoming tropical, before it was last noted by RSMC Nadi on January 24. During January 22, RSMC Nadi also started monitoring Tropical Disturbance 10F, which had developed around 740 km (460 mi) to the northeast of Port Vila, Vanuatu. The system lied within an area of moderate to high vertical windshear to the north of an upper-level ridge of high pressure. Over the next couple of days the system moved westwards into an area of low vertical windshear and the Australian region, where it developed into Tropical Cyclone Dylan during January 26. Tropical Disturbance 11F subsequently developed to the southwest of Nadi, Fiji during January 29. The system lay to the east of an upper-level trough of low pressure within an area of high vertical windshear. During that day the system moved towards the east-southeast and was subsequently last noted by RSMC Nadi later that day as it moved into TCWC Wellingtons area of responsibility.

Tropical Disturbance 13F formed on February 16, to the north-northwest of Vanuatu. Due to unfavorable conditions of turning into a depression, 13F dissipated near a subtropical ridge early on February 19. During February 23, RSMC Nadi reported that Tropical Disturbance 14F had developed, within a trough of low pressure to the north-northwest of Maewo, Vanuatu. Over the next day the system moved slowly towards the south-southeast and developed into a tropical depression. Over the next two days the system continued to move towards the south-southeast and prompted heavy rain warnings for Fiji, before it dissipated during February 26. Late on February 26, RSMC Nadi reported that Tropical Disturbance 16F, had developed about 90 km (55 mi) south of the Indispensable Reefs. Over the next day the system moved westwards and moved into the Australian region, where it eventually developed into Tropical Cyclone Hadi during March 9. On March 6, RSMC Nadi reported that Tropical Disturbance 17F had developed about 80 km (50 mi) to the northeast of Port Vila, Vanuatu. Over the next two days the system remained weak as it moved south-westwards, before it was last noted during March 8, as it moved into an area of moderate to high vertical windshear and the Australian Region. Tropical Cyclone Hadi subsequently moved back into the South Pacific basin late on March 12, where RSMC Nadi designated it as Tropical Disturbance 20F. On March 18, the Tropical Disturbance re-exited the South Pacific basin into the Australian basin. The last tropical disturbance of the season: 21F, formed on March 17, about 500 km (310 mi) to the north of Rarotonga in the Cook Islands, before dissipating two days later.

== Storm names ==
Within the Southern Pacific a tropical depression is judged to have reached tropical cyclone intensity should it reach winds of 65 km/h (40 mph) and it is evident that gales are occurring at least halfway around the center. Tropical depressions that intensify into a tropical cyclone between the Equator and 25°S and between 160°E and 120°W are named by the FMS. However, should a tropical depression intensify to the south of 25°S between 160°E and 120°W it will be named by MetService in conjunction with the FMS. If a tropical cyclone moves out of the basin and into the Australian region, it will retain its original name. The names Kofi and Mike would be used for the first time this year, after replacing the names Keli, and Martin after the 1996-97 and 1997-98 seasons respectively. The names that were used for the 2013-14 season are listed below:

- Ian
- June
- Kofi
- Lusi
- Mike

If a tropical cyclone enters the South Pacific basin from the Australian region basin (west of 160°E), it will retain the name assigned to it by the Australian Bureau of Meteorology. The following storms were named in this manner:

- Edna
- Hadi

=== Retirement ===
After the season, the names Ian, and Lusi were both retired, and replaced with Isa and Louise respectively.

== Season effects ==
This table lists all the storms that developed in the South Pacific to the east of longitude 160°E during the 2013–2014 season. It includes their intensity on the Australian tropical cyclone intensity scale, duration, name, landfalls, deaths, and damages. All data is taken from RSMC Nadi and/or TCWC Wellington, and all of the damage figures are in 2014 USD.

Name	Dates	Peak intensity			Areas affected	Damage (USD)	Deaths	Ref(s).
Name	Dates	Category	Wind speed	Pressure	Areas affected	Damage (USD)	Deaths	Ref(s).
01F	October 19–20	Tropical disturbance	Not specified	1,004 hPa (29.65 inHg)	Solomon Islands, Vanuatu	None	None	
02F	October 19–23	Tropical depression	Not specified	1,002 hPa (29.59 inHg)	Kiribati, Vanuatu	None	None	
03F	October 21–22	Tropical depression	Not specified	1,005 hPa (29.68 inHg)	Solomon Islands	None	None	
04F	October 25–27	Tropical depression	Not specified	1,007 hPa (29.74 inHg)	Solomon Islands	None	None	
05F	December 9–13	Tropical depression	Not specified	999 hPa (29.50 inHg)	Fiji, Tonga	None	None	
06F	December 23–29	Tropical disturbance	Not specified	1,003 hPa (29.62 inHg)	Vanuatu	None	None	
Ian	January 2–14	Category 5 severe tropical cyclone	205 km/h (125 mph)	930 hPa (27.46 inHg)	Fiji, Tonga	$120 million	1	
June	January 13–19	Category 1 tropical cyclone	75 km/h (45 mph)	990 hPa (29.23 inHg)	Solomon Islands, New Caledonia, New Zealand	Minor	1	
09F	January 21–24	Tropical depression	Not specified	1,004 hPa (29.65 inHg)	Cook Islands, Niue, Tonga	None	None	
10F	January 22–24	Tropical disturbance	Not specified	1,004 hPa (29.65 inHg)	Solomon Islands	None	None	
11F	January 29	Tropical disturbance	Not specified	1,000 hPa (29.53 inHg)	Fiji	None	None	
Edna	February 4–6	Category 2 tropical cyclone	95 km/h (60 mph)	985 hPa (29.09 inHg)	New Caledonia, New Zealand	None	None	
13F	February 16–19	Tropical disturbance	Not specified	1,003 hPa (29.62 inHg)	Vanuatu, Fiji	None	None	
14F	February 23–26	Tropical depression	Not specified	1,002 hPa (29.59 inHg)	Vanuatu, Fiji	None	None	
Kofi	February 24 – March 4	Category 2 tropical cyclone	100 km/h (60 mph)	980 hPa (28.94 inHg)	Fiji, Tonga	None	None	
16F/20F (Hadi)	February 26 – March 18	Tropical disturbance	Not specified	1,000 hPa (29.53 inHg)	Solomon Islands, Vanuatu	Unknown	None	
17F	March 6–8	Tropical disturbance	Not specified	1,005 hPa (29.68 inHg)	Vanuatu	None	None	
Lusi	March 7–14	Category 3 severe tropical cyclone	150 km/h (95 mph)	960 hPa (28.35 inHg)	Vanuatu, Fiji, New Zealand	$3 million	10	
Mike	March 12–20	Category 1 tropical cyclone	65 km/h (40 mph)	990 hPa (29.23 inHg)	Cook Islands	Minor	None	
21F	March 17–19	Tropical depression	45 km/h (30 mph)	998 hPa (29.47 inHg)	None	None	None	
Season aggregates
20 systems	October 19 – March 20		205 km/h (125 mph)	930 hPa (27.46 inHg)		$123 million	12	

== See also ==
- Tropical cyclones in 2013 and 2014
- List of South Pacific cyclone seasons
- Atlantic hurricane seasons: 2013, 2014
- Pacific hurricane seasons: 2013, 2014
- Pacific typhoon seasons: 2013, 2014
- North Indian Ocean cyclone seasons: 2013, 2014
- 2013–14 South-West Indian Ocean cyclone season
- 2013–14 Australian region cyclone season
