= Motu Ngangie =

Islet in Palmerston Island in the Cook Islands, Pacific Ocean

Coordinates: 18°1′45.87″S 163°7′59.89″W

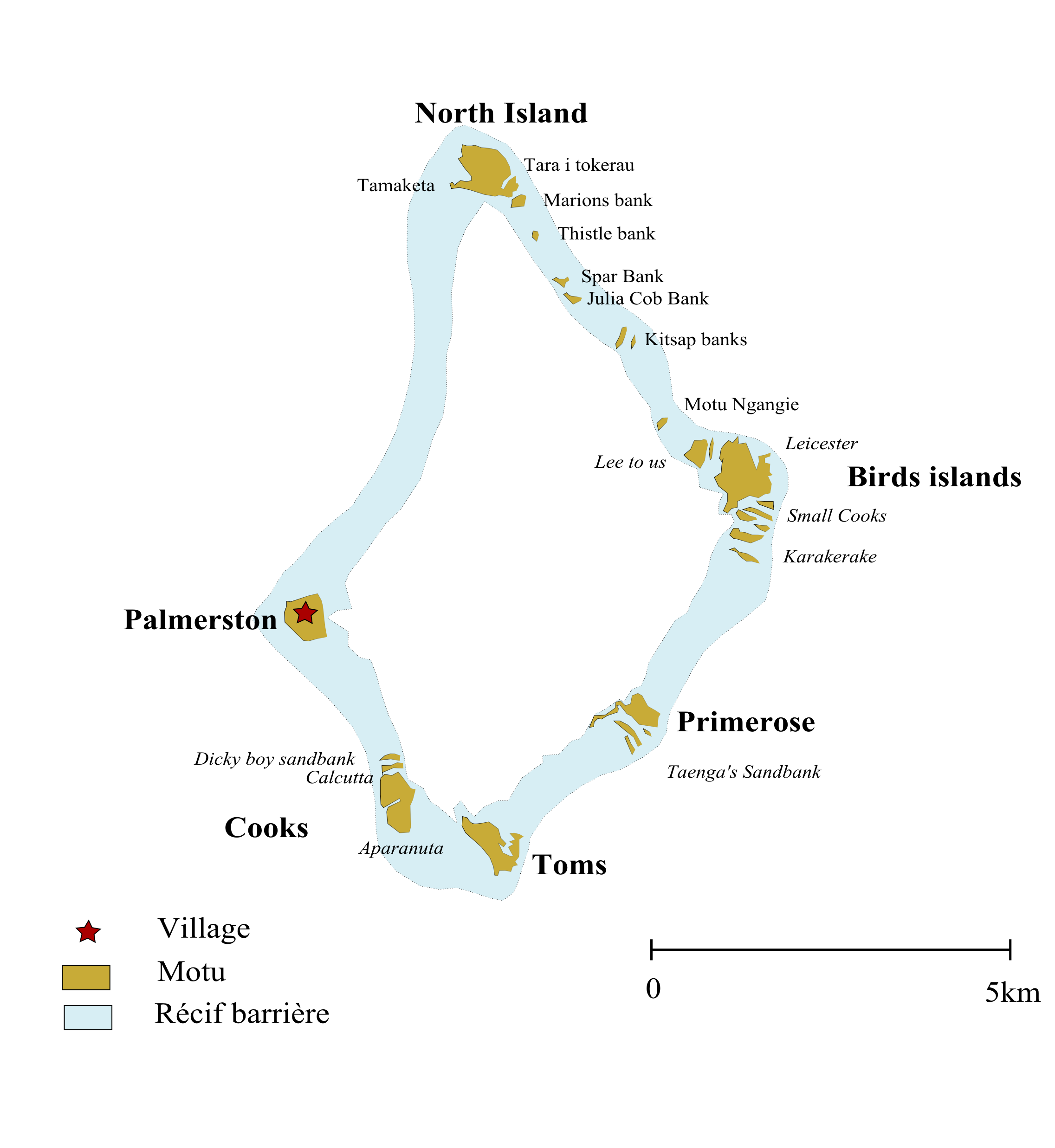
Map of Palmerston

Motu Ngangie is an islet in Palmerston Island in the Cook Islands. it is on the eastern side of the atoll, between Marions bank and Lee To Us. The island is named after the ngangie plant.
