= Toms (islet) =

Islet in Palmerston Island in the Cook Islands, Pacific Ocean

Coordinates: 18°5′18.35″S 163°9′37.31″W

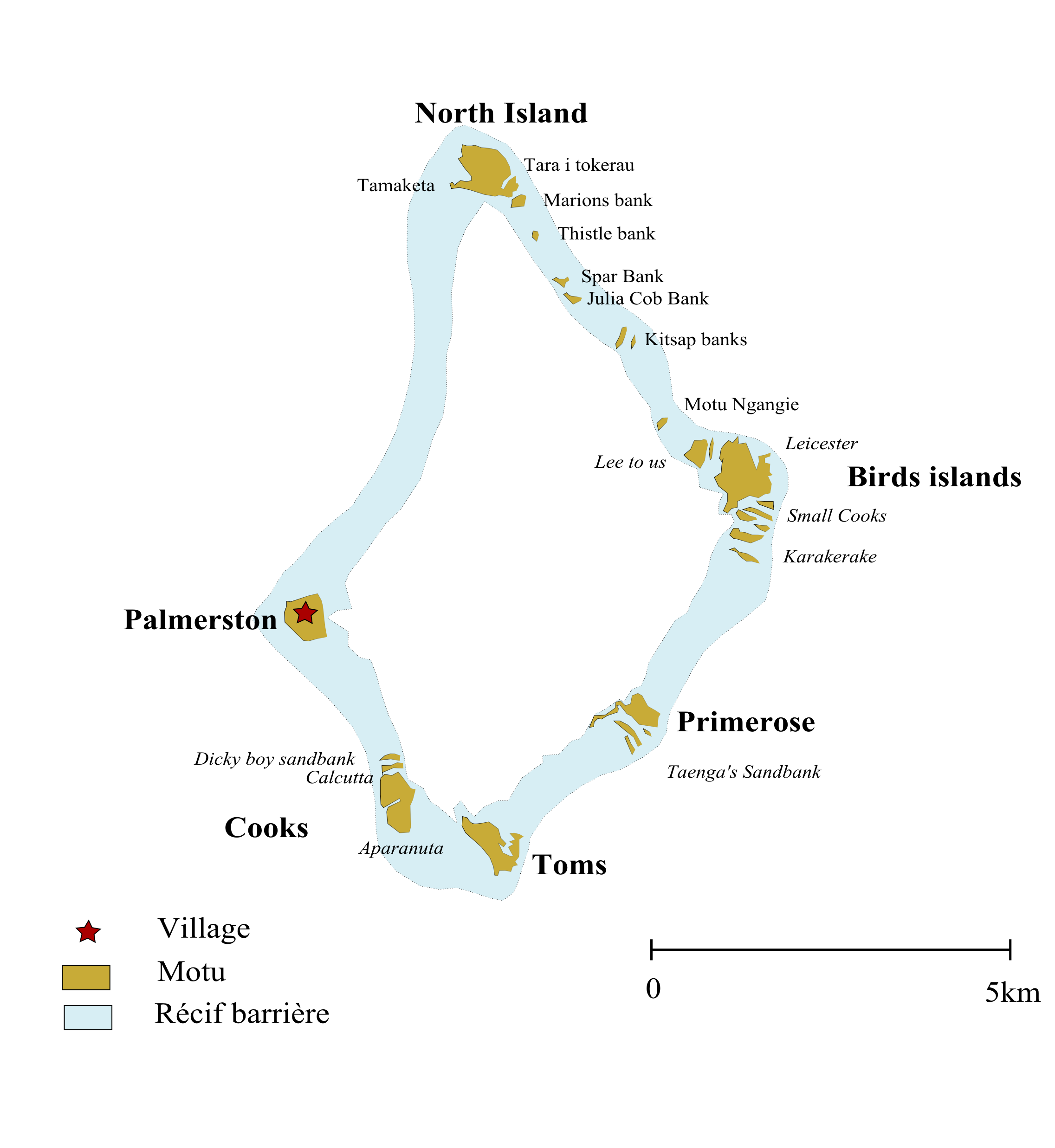
Map of Palmerston

Toms is an islet in Palmerston Island in the Cook Islands. It is at the southern tip of the atoll, between Primrose and Cooks. The island is named after someone from Palmerston's history.
