= Home (islet) =

Islet of Palmerston Island, Cook Islands

Coordinates: 18°3′22.23″S 163°11′28.18″W

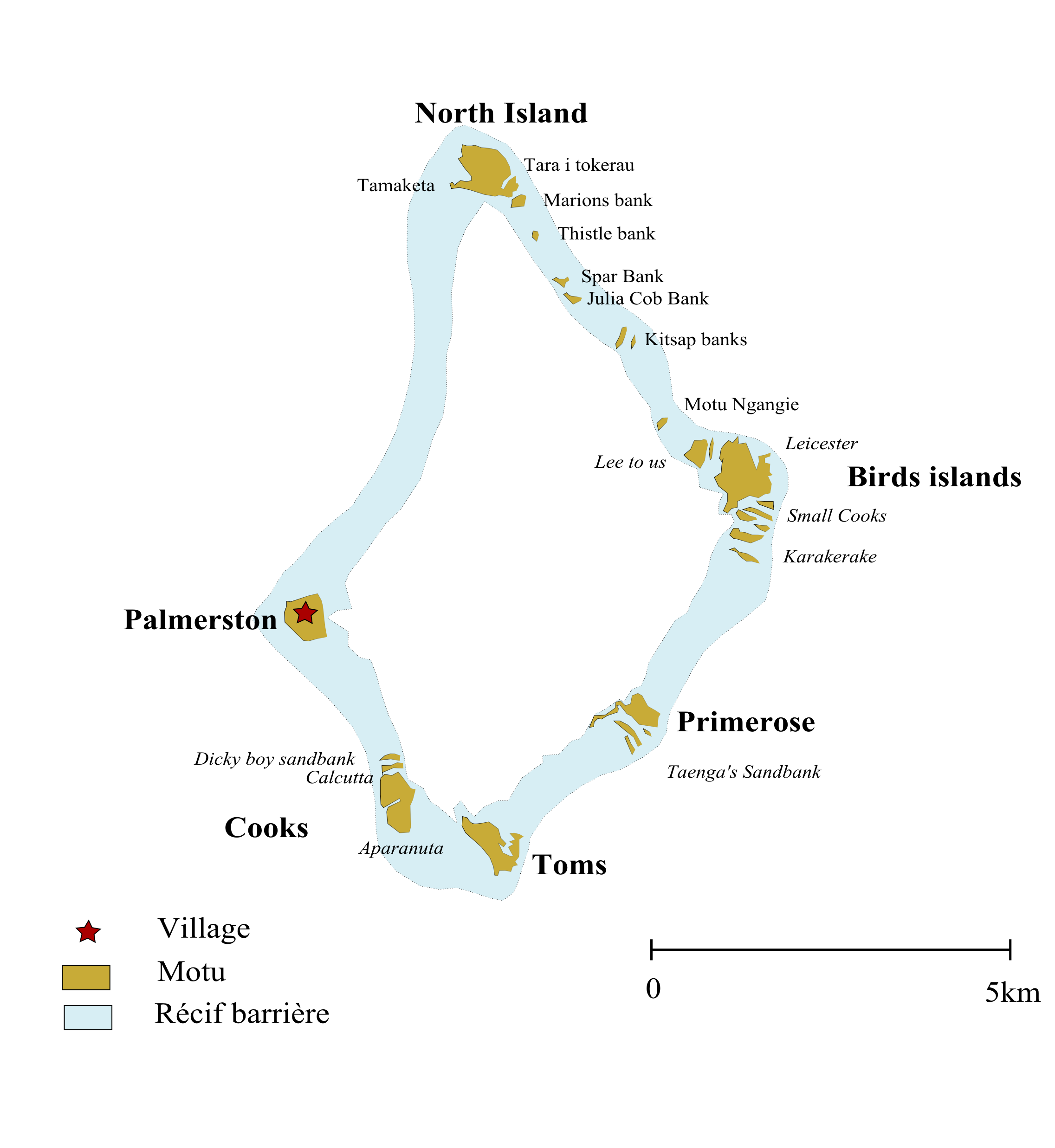
Map of Palmerston

Home is an islet in Palmerston Island in the Cook Islands. Sometimes referred to as Palmerston or Pamati, the name given to the atoll by James Cook, it is the only inhabited islet in the atoll. It is on the west side of the atoll, between Cooks and North Island.
