= Cyclone Lusi =

Severe Tropical Cyclone Lusi
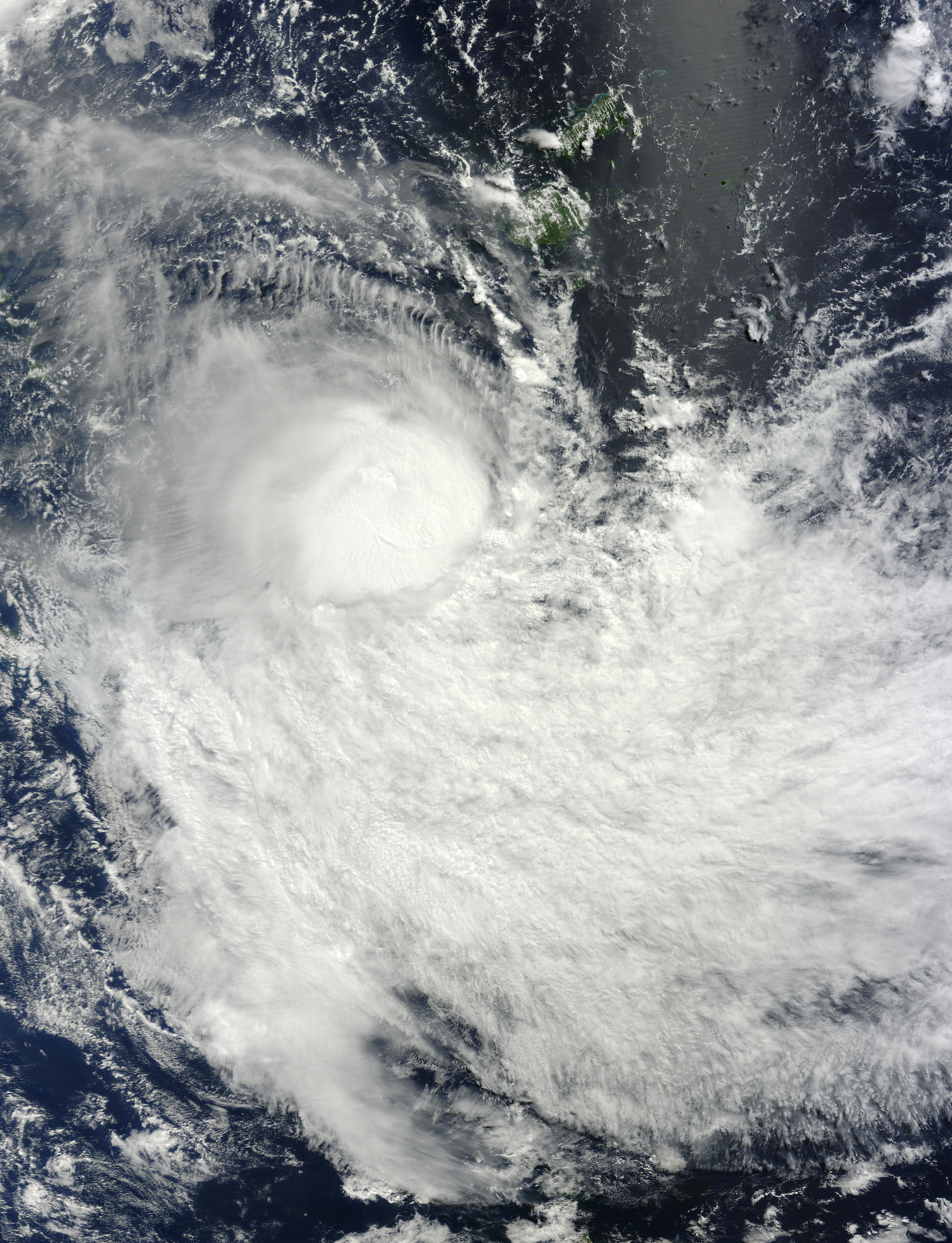
- Cyclone Lusi on March 12, 2014

Meteorological history
- Formed: 7 March 2014
- Extratropical: 14 March 2014
- Dissipated: 17 March 2014

Category 3 severe tropical cyclone
- 10-minute sustained (FMS)
- Highest winds: 150 km/h (90 mph)
- Lowest pressure: 960 hPa (mbar); 28.35 inHg

Category 1-equivalent tropical cyclone
- 1-minute sustained (SSHWS/JTWC)
- Highest winds: 130 km/h (80 mph)
- Lowest pressure: 970 hPa (mbar); 28.64 inHg

Overall effects
- Fatalities: 10
- Damage: $3 million (2014 USD) (New Zealand only)
- Areas affected: Vanuatu, Fiji, New Zealand
- IBTrACS /
- Part of the 2013–14 South Pacific cyclone season

Severe Tropical Cyclone Lusi was the second severe tropical cyclone of the 2013–14 season and affected Fiji, Vanuatu and New Zealand.

The system that was to become Cyclone Lusi was first noted as a tropical disturbance on 7 March, while it was located to the east of Fiji. Over the next three days the system moved towards the north-northeast and gradually developed further, before it was named Lusi, late on 9 March, after it had developed into a tropical cyclone. The system dissipated on 17 March.

== Meteorological history ==
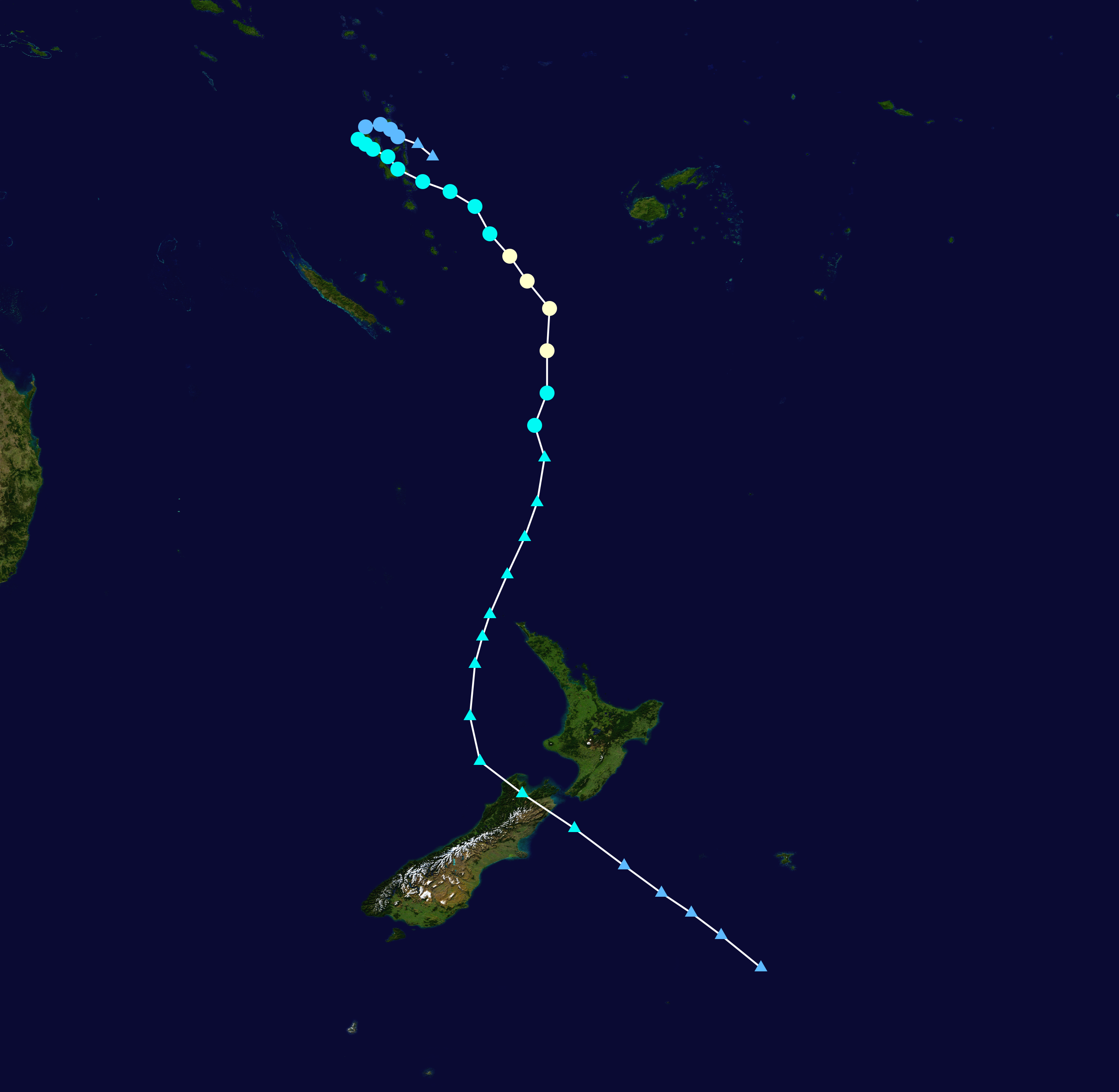
Map plotting the storm's track and intensity, according to the Saffir–Simpson scale Map key Saffir–Simpson scale Tropical depression (≤38 mph, ≤62 km/h) Tropical storm (39–73 mph, 63–118 km/h) Category 1 (74–95 mph, 119–153 km/h) Category 2 (96–110 mph, 154–177 km/h) Category 3 (111–129 mph, 178–208 km/h) Category 4 (130–156 mph, 209–251 km/h) Category 5 (≥157 mph, ≥252 km/h) Unknown Storm type Tropical cyclone Subtropical cyclone Extratropical cyclone, remnant low, tropical disturbance, or monsoon depression

Early on 7 March 2014, the Fiji Meteorological Service reported that Tropical Disturbance 18F had developed about 685 km (425 mi) to the west of Nadi. The system was located within a marginally favourable environment for further development, which included low to moderate vertical wind shear and favourable sea surface temperatures. Over the next two days the system moved towards the north-northwest and slowly consolidated, as atmospheric convection wrapped into the system's low level circulation centre, before RSMC Nadi reported during 9 March that the system had developed into a tropical depression. During that day the system further consolidated as it affected Vanuatu and moved towards the north-northeast, before the United States Joint Typhoon Warning Center initiated warnings and designated the depression as Tropical Cyclone 18P later that day. RSMC Nadi subsequently named the system Lusi at around 23:00 UTC (11:00 FST), after it had developed into a category 1 tropical cyclone on the Australian tropical cyclone intensity scale.

== Preparations and impact ==
=== Vanuatu ===
Late on 9 March, ahead of the depression being classified as a tropical cyclone and named Lusi, the Vanuatu Meteorology and Geo-Hazards Department issued tropical cyclone warnings for the Vanuatu provinces of Torba, Sanma, Penama and Malampa.

The cyclone killed 10 people and impacted as many as 20,000 people, especially in Torba, Sanma, Penama, Malampa and Shefa Provinces. Many low-lying areas were flooded and more than 40 structures were damaged or destroyed. All provinces of the country reported damage to agriculture.

=== Fiji ===
On 11 March, a tropical cyclone alert was issued for parts of the Western Division, as Lusi approached the islands from the west. During the next day gale warnings were issued for the Western Division before they were cancelled later that day, as the system turned towards the south sooner than had been expected. As a result, Fiji was spared any direct effects from the cyclone, while the associated trough of low pressure affected the islands until 13 March.

=== New Zealand ===
During 9 March, MetService started to warn that a tropical weather system might affect New Zealand by the end of that week.

Cyclone Lusi hit New Zealand shores on 13 March. In preparation for the event the New Zealand government advised people to fix loosened things (such as trampolines), and the Civil Defense team was put on alert. Winds reaching up to 130 km/h were expected to occur in the cities of Auckland, Whangārei and Hamilton, and the east coast of the North Island was put on high alert. Lusi brought severe winds as it moved southeast towards Wellington and the northern South Island in the evening of 15 March. On 16 March, the severe gale winds slightly weakened, and Lusi pushed away from New Zealand on 17 March.

Insured losses across the country amounted to NZ$4 million (US$3 million).

== Retirement ==
Due to the impacts caused by the storm, the name Lusi was retired and was later replaced by Louise.

== See also ==
- Cyclone Susan
- Cyclone Evan
