= Primrose (islet) =

Islet in Palmerston Island, Cook Islands

Coordinates: 18°4′10.35″S 163°8′11.57″W

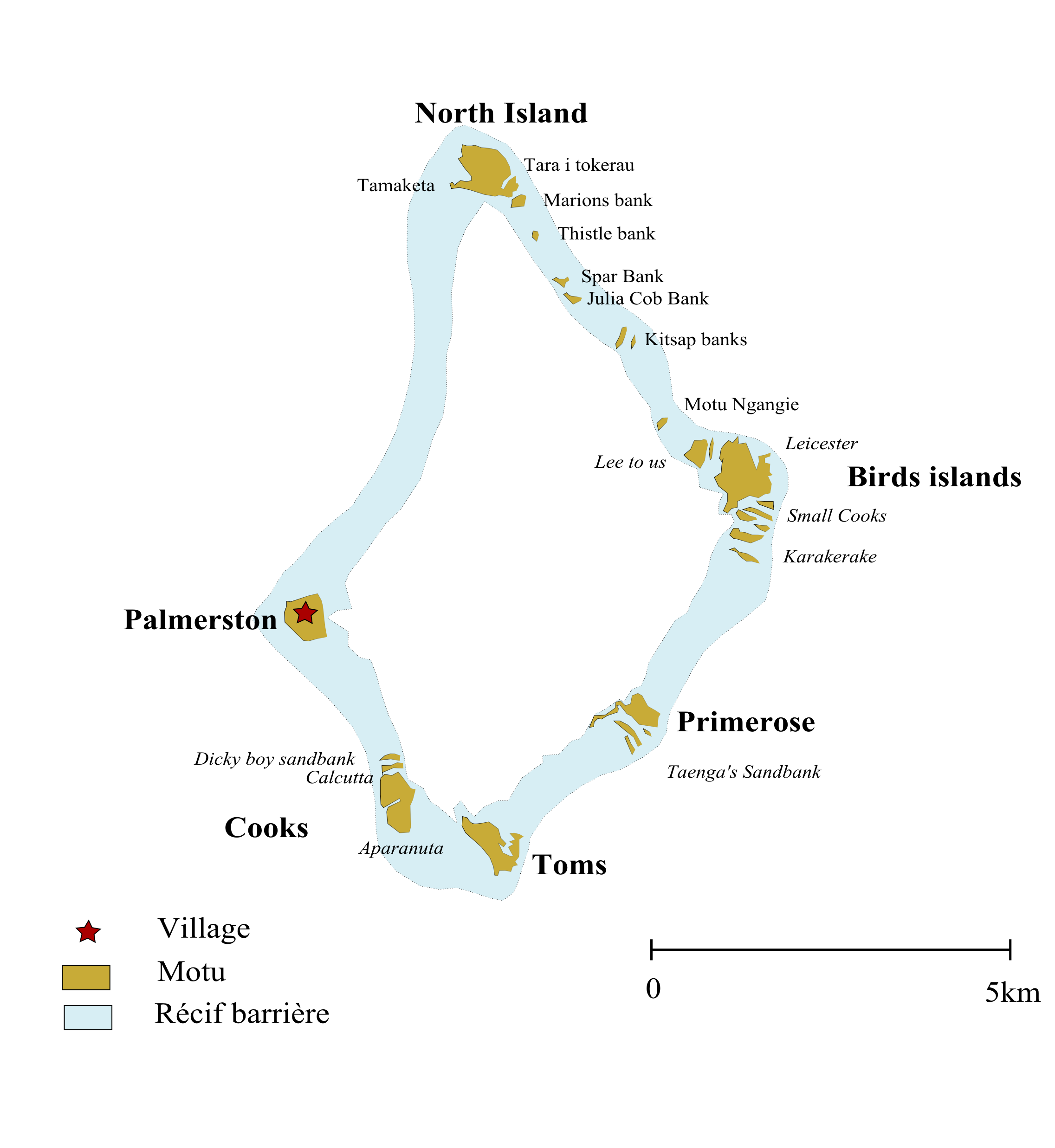
Map of Palmerston

Primrose is an islet in Palmerston Island in the Cook Islands. It is on the southeastern edge of the atoll, between Karakerake and Toms. The islet is named after a ship which was wrecked there.
