= North Island (islet) =

Islet in Palmerston Island in the Cook Islands, Pacific Ocean

Coordinates: 17°59′38.81″S 163°9′43.65″W

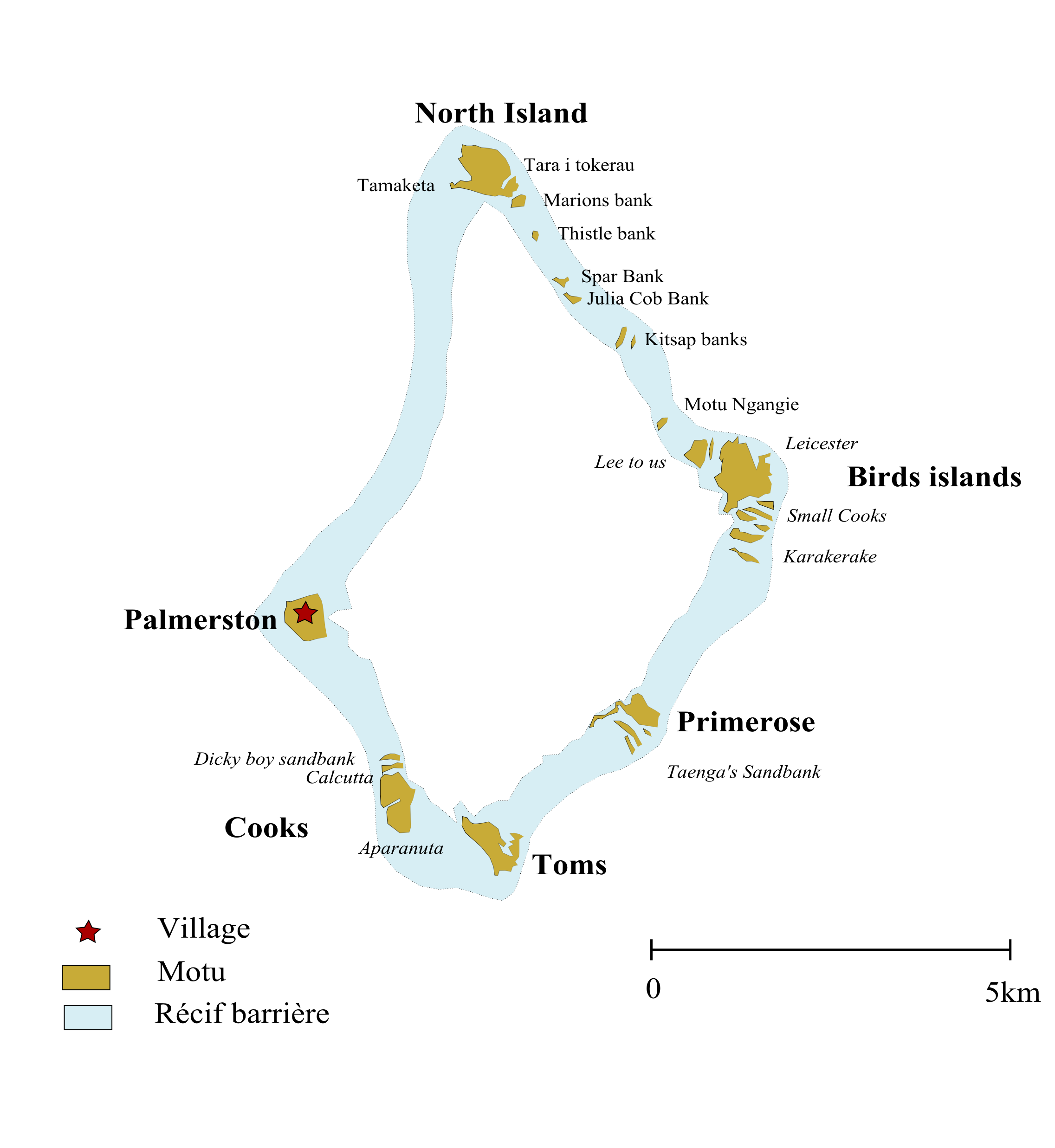
Map of Palmerston

North Island is an islet in Palmerston Island in the Cook Islands. The islet's name is a simple physical description. it is at the northern tip of the atoll, between Home and Tara i tokerau.
