= Cooks (islet) =

Islet in Palmerston Island in the Cook Islands, Pacific Ocean

Coordinates: 18°5′2.84″S 163°10′31.18″W

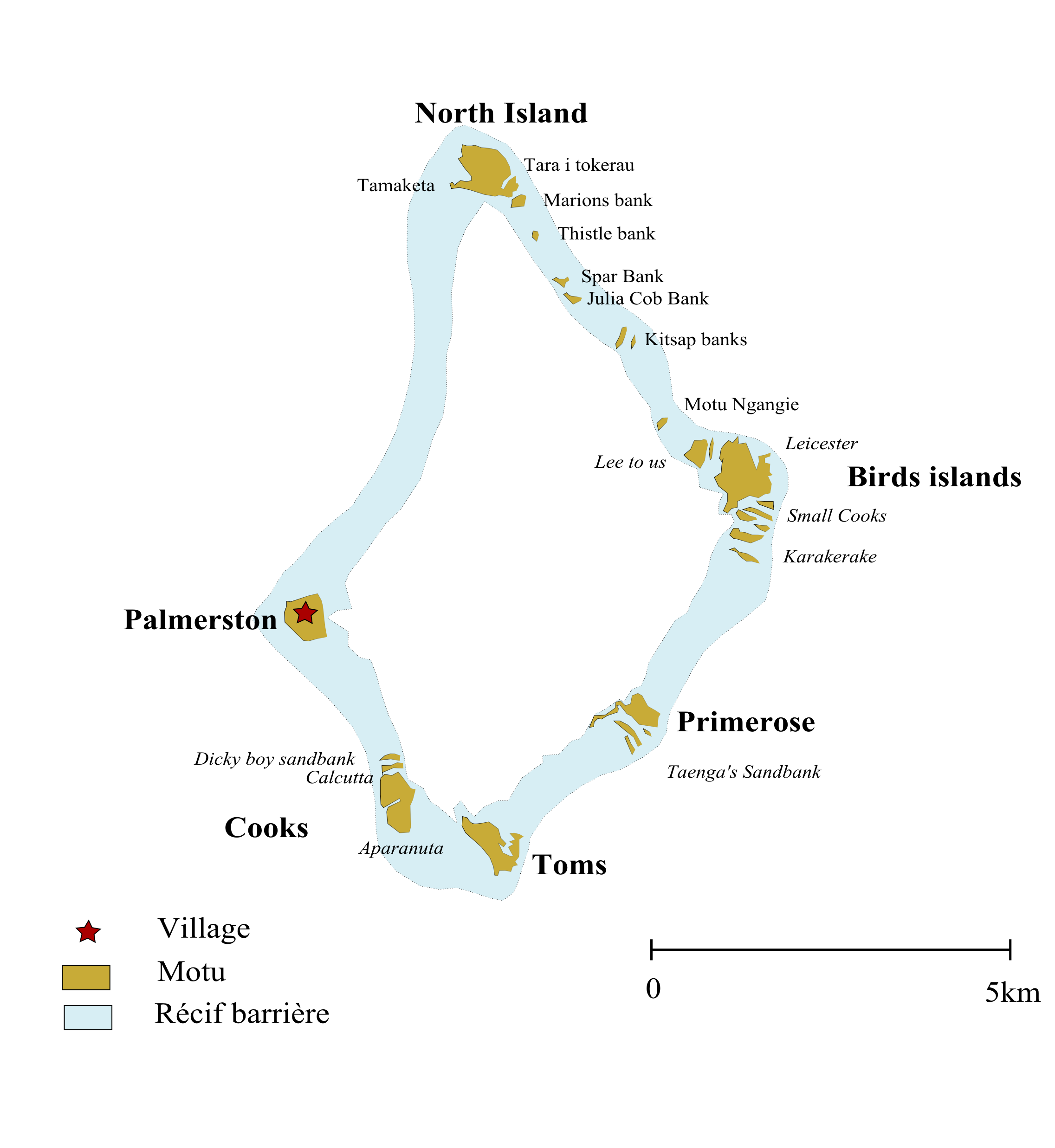
Map of Palmerston

Cooks is an islet in Palmerston Island in the Cook Islands. It is on the southern edge of the atoll, between Toms and Home. The islet is named after James Cook.
