= William Marsters =

English adventurer (1821–1899)

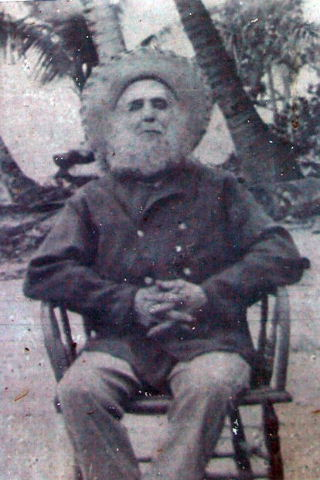
- William Marsters on Palmerston Atoll
- Born: Richard William Masters; 6 November 1831; Walcote, Leicestershire
- Died: 22 May 1899 (aged 67); Palmerston Island, Cook Islands
- Occupations: Sailor, cooper, merchant
- Known for: English adventurer who settled on Palmerston Island in the Pacific

William Marsters (born Richard Masters) (6 November 1831– 22 May 1899) was an English adventurer from Walcote, Leicestershire who settled on Palmerston Island in the Cook Islands on 8 July 1863, with his three Polynesian wives. A handful of his descendants continue to live on Palmerston Island, while the majority now live in Rarotonga, or elsewhere in the Cook Islands, New Zealand and Australia.

== Life ==
William Marsters was born Richard Masters in 1831. He came from Leicestershire, England, and arrived in the Pacific around 1856. He first settled in Penrhyn, the most Northern of the Cook Islands. He married the daughter of one of the chiefs on the Island and in 1862 they moved to Manuae and then to Palmerston on 8 July 1863 (or 1861 or 1864, according to different documents). They were accompanied by his wife's cousin with whom he later had children. His task was to produce copra and collect bêche-de-mer for a Tahitian trader named Brander, but Brander never returned. Marsters decided to settle his family permanently on the island. He took up a third wife, and the descendants of these three Penrhyn women make up the present inhabitants of Palmerston. Marsters died on 22 May 1899 at the age of 67 (although his headstone records his age as 78). He had 23 children and 134 grandchildren.

== Ownership ==
In 1887, a Scotsman, George Darsie, contested an application by Marsters for a license to lease the island. Palmerston was annexed by the UK on 23 May 1891 and in 1892, the British Government granted William a 21-year lease which was extended until 1954. Full ownership of Palmerston Atoll was granted to the Marsters family in 1954 by an amendment to the Cook Islands Act passed by the New Zealand Government.

== Succession ==
Two years after William Marsters died, disputes arose about the succession of the leader. In 1901, Colonel Walter Edward Gudgeon, the British Resident in Rarotonga, appointed William's eldest son, Joel, agent to the British Resident and Magistrate for the Island. In 1992 the Palmerston Act was passed, and today Palmerston is governed by this Act, along with the Outer Island Act.

== Island Council ==
Before William Marsters died, he organized the island so that each of the three wives and their descendants had a share of the main island and each of the atolls. This arrangement still stands. Today the Island has its own council, representing the local government, which consists of six members, the Head of each Family – Matavia family, Akakaingaro family and the Te Pou family, and one other member appointed from and by each of the three families. This appointment is carried out every four years, and the Mayor of the Island is appointed from one of the three Heads, in a rotational manner.

On Palmerston, each of the three families has their own version of the history of Palmerston and life of William Marsters. This has been passed down by word of mouth from their great-great-grandparents. Although oral tradition may differ from the documented versions, each will stand by their version.

== British connection ==
Palmerston Islanders still pride themselves on their British heritage: they fly the British flag on special occasions, have large photos of Queen Elizabeth in their homes and remember fondly the visits of the Royal Yacht Britannia. On the last visit by the royal family, Prince Philip came ashore and swam in the pool close to the beach; the site was subsequently renamed "Duke’s Pool".
