= Palmerston Island =

Island in the Cook Islands

Coordinates: 18°04′S 163°10′W

Palmerston
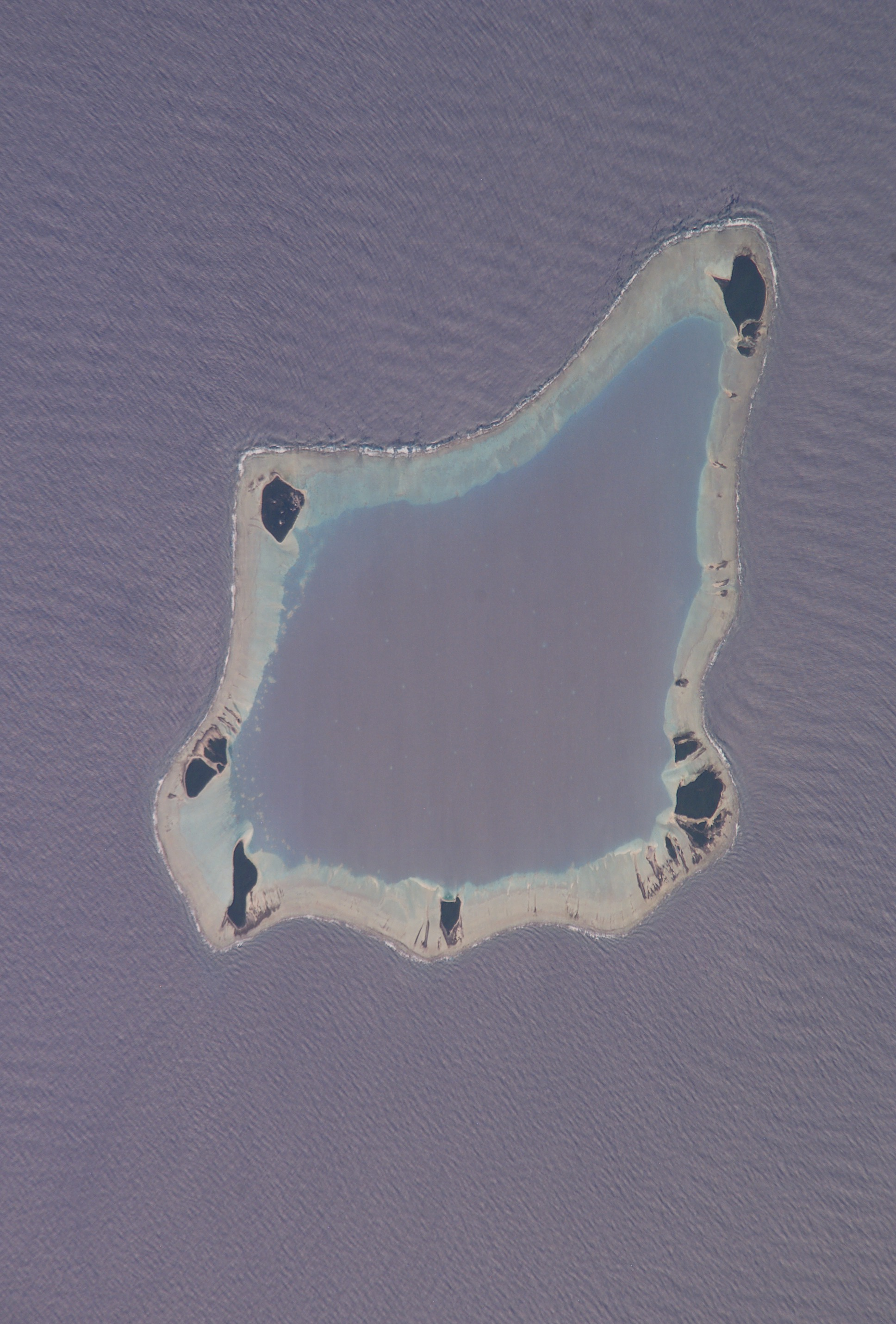
- Satellite image of Palmerston
- Interactive map of Palmerston

Geography
- Location: Central-Southern Pacific Ocean
- Archipelago: Cook Islands
- Area: 2.6 km^{2} (1.0 sq mi)

Administration
- Cook Islands

Demographics
- Population: 62
- Ethnic groups: Polynesian, English

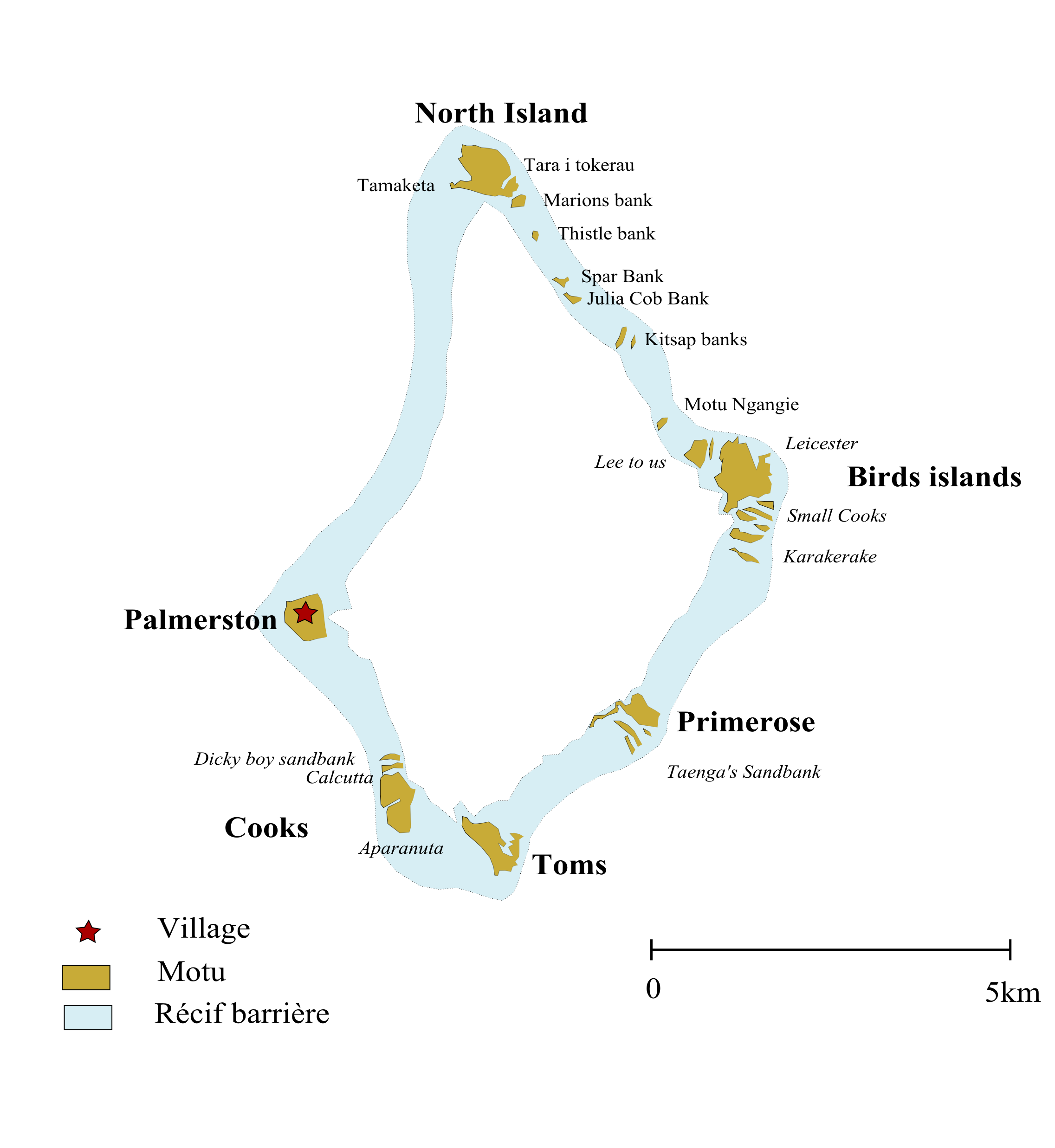
Map of Palmerston

Palmerston Island is a coral atoll in the Cook Islands in the Pacific Ocean about 290 miles (470 km) northwest of Rarotonga. James Cook landed there on 16 June 1774.

== Overview ==
Palmerston Island is one of a number of sandy islets on a continuous ring of coral reef enclosing a lagoon. The only inhabited islet is Home. The total land area of the islets is approximately 1 square mile (2.6 km^{2}). The coral reef covers about 3,600 acres (15 km^{2}). The lagoon is some 7 miles (11 km) across, covering an area of 22 square miles (57 km^{2}). There are several small passages through the reef for boats, though there is no safe entry for large ships. At a latitude of 18 degrees south, Palmerston enjoys a tropical climate but is exposed to severe tropical cyclones. A particularly destructive series of storms occurred during the 1920s and 1930s. The atoll rim consists of a series of motu or islets. Clockwise from Home, these include:

- Home
- North Island
- Tara i Tokerau
- Marions Bank
- Motu Ngangie
- Lee To Us
- Leicester
- Small Cooks
- Karakerake
- Primrose
- Toms
- Cooks

All the islets are wooded with coconut palms, pandanus, and native trees. There is some natural ground water on Palmerston but water captured from rainfall is preferred for drinking. Shellfish inhabit the reef, and fish are abundant although there are concerns about overfishing. Approximately 25 people live on Palmerston, all but two descended from 19th century English sailor William Marsters.

The economy is based on fishing. Palmerston's extreme remoteness makes a cash market difficult to maintain, so life is similar to subsistence living on the more northern atolls. Electricity and other modern utilities are available. Communication to the outside world is provided by Vodafone Cook Islands (landline, internet and cellular) and Starlink (high speed satellite internet). The island has no airport or air service, but cargo ships visit a few times a year.

== History ==
Palmerston was recorded by Captain James Cook in 1774, but he did not land on the island until 13 April 1777. He found it uninhabited, though some ancient graves were discovered. Cook named the island after Henry Temple, 2nd Viscount Palmerston, then one of the Lords Commissioner of the Admiralty. The ancient name of the island was supposedly Avarau, meaning "two hundred harbours". In 1863 William Marsters, a ship's carpenter and barrel maker, arrived on Palmerston from Manuae with two Polynesian wives. He added a third wife and sired a large family of some 23 children, whose descendants now inhabit Palmerston. Thus, Palmerston Island is the only island in the Cook Islands for which English is the native language.

Palmerston was annexed by the British Empire on 23 May 1891 and in 1892, the British Government granted William a 21-year lease which was extended until 1954. Palmerston came under New Zealand administration in 1901.

William Marsters, originally thought to have come from Leicestershire, England, is now believed to have come from Gloucestershire, which might explain why his descendants now spell the name "Marsters" due to the Gloucestershire accent. By the time his youngest daughter Titana Tangi died in 1973, there were over a thousand of Marsters' descendants living in Rarotonga and New Zealand.

Though only some 25 people remain on Palmerston, all of Marsters' descendants consider the island their ancestral home. In 1954, the Marsters family was granted full ownership of the island. Three branches of the family remain on Palmerston, each branch being descended from one of William's three wives, and marriage within a family group being prohibited. All three wives came from Tongareva and there are still many family links and common ancestors between these atolls.

== Governance ==
Palmerston is administered by the Cook Islands government, through the Palmerston Island Administration (PIA), in free association with New Zealand.

The Island's Council consists of six members: the three heads of each branch of the Marsters, and three other members appointed by each family. The present Mayor is Bill Marsters.

== Ecology ==
In December 2024 the atoll was declared rat-free following an eradication campaign in 2023.

== See also ==
- Scratch My Arse Rock, a fishing spot supposedly named by Marsters
