= Tropical Storm Nakri (2014) =

Pacific severe tropical storm in 2014

Severe Tropical Storm Nakri (Inday)
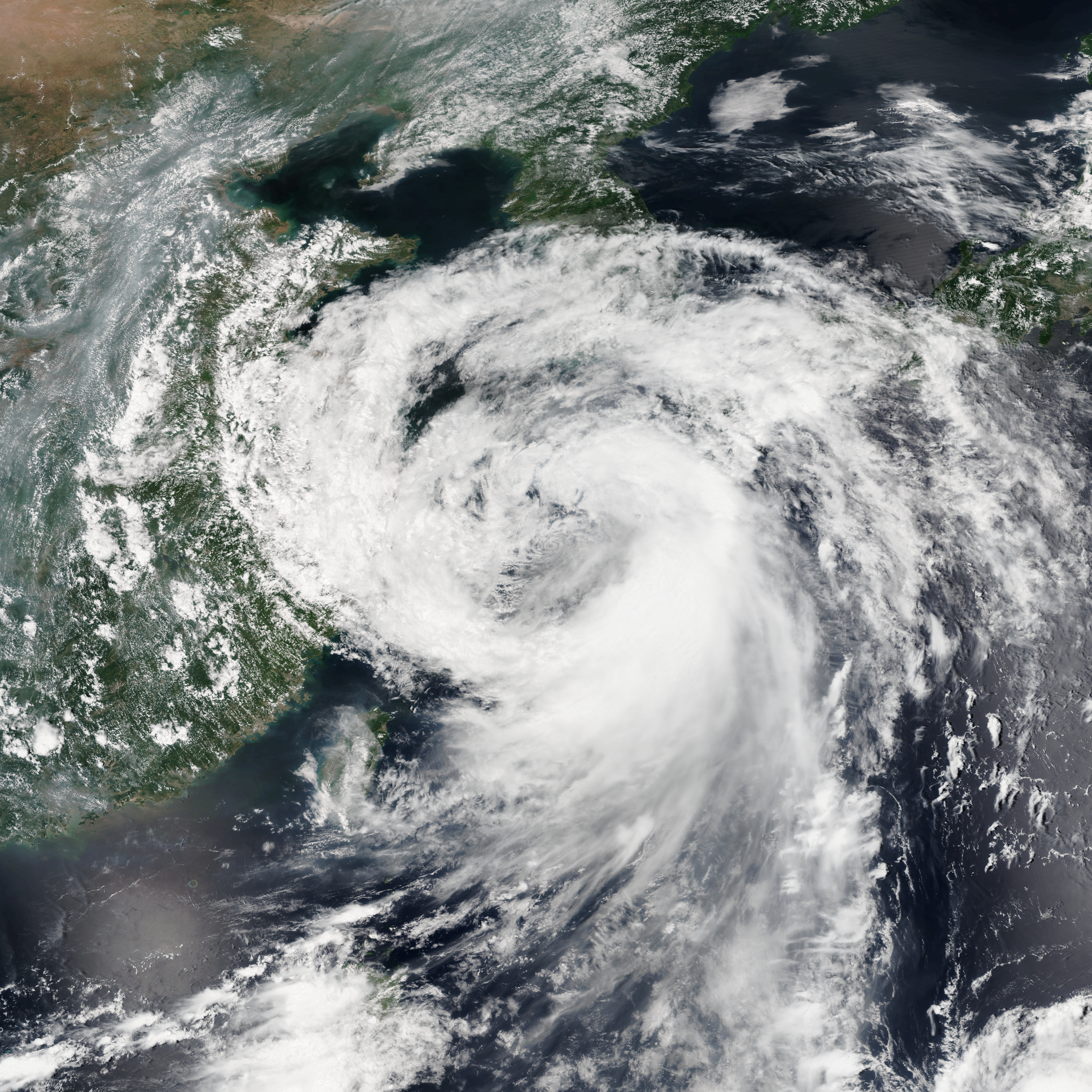
- Nakri as a severe tropical storm over the Yellow Sea on August 1

Meteorological history
- Formed: July 28, 2014
- Dissipated: August 4, 2014

Severe tropical storm
- 10-minute sustained (JMA)
- Highest winds: 100 km/h (65 mph)
- Lowest pressure: 980 hPa (mbar); 28.94 inHg

Tropical storm
- 1-minute sustained (SSHWS/JTWC)
- Highest winds: 75 km/h (45 mph)
- Lowest pressure: 992 hPa (mbar); 29.29 inHg

Overall effects
- Fatalities: 16
- Damage: $117,000 (2014 USD)
- Areas affected: Guam, Philippines, Japan, East China, Korea
- IBTrACS
- Part of the 2014 Pacific typhoon season

Severe Tropical Storm Nakri, known in the Philippines as Tropical Storm Inday, was a large, long-lived, and slow-moving tropical cyclone that produced prolific rains over Japan and South Korea in early August 2014.

== Meteorological history ==
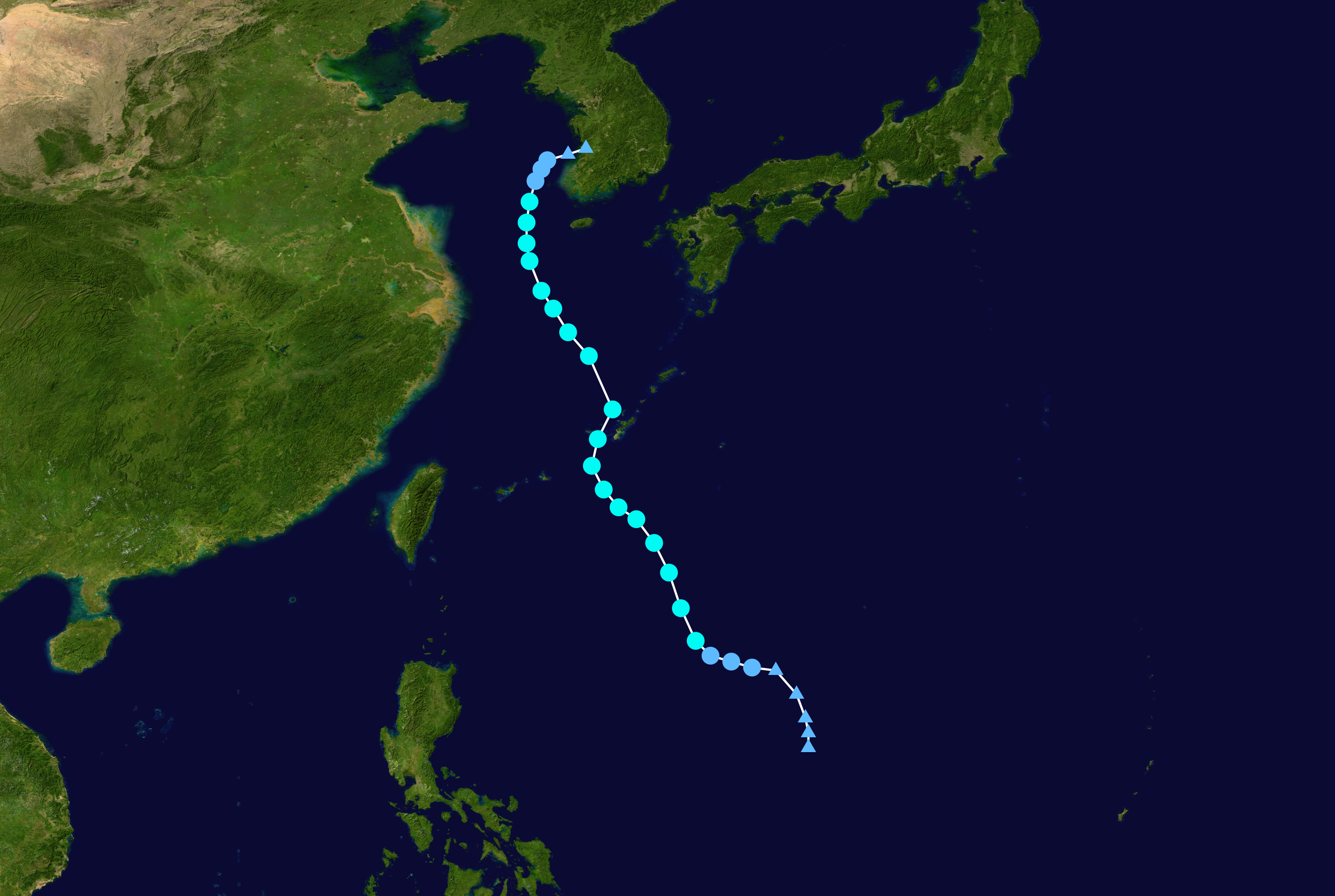
Map plotting the storm's track and intensity, according to the Saffir–Simpson scale Map key Saffir–Simpson scale Tropical depression (≤38 mph, ≤62 km/h) Tropical storm (39–73 mph, 63–118 km/h) Category 1 (74–95 mph, 119–153 km/h) Category 2 (96–110 mph, 154–177 km/h) Category 3 (111–129 mph, 178–208 km/h) Category 4 (130–156 mph, 209–251 km/h) Category 5 (≥157 mph, ≥252 km/h) Unknown Storm type Tropical cyclone Subtropical cyclone Extratropical cyclone, remnant low, tropical disturbance, or monsoon depression

On July 28, the JMA and the PAGASA started to track a tropical depression well east of the Babuyan Islands, with PAGASA naming it as Inday. Gradually intensifying, the JMA upgraded the system to a tropical storm the next day named Nakri. (Note: The name Nakri (Khmer: ណាគ្រី, [naː.ˈkriː]) was contributed by Cambodia and refers to the night-blooming jasmine (Cestrum nocturnum) in Khmer.) After passing through the Ryukyu Islands, on July 31, Nakri further deepened into a severe tropical storm. The JTWC, although, had only classified this as a "monsoonal disturbance" with winds packing at 40 knots. As Nakri neared the Korean Peninsula, the JTWC had begun warning on the system, although the JMA had already downgraded it to a tropical storm. Six hours later, the JTWC downgraded the system to a depression and stopped warning on Nakri. The JMA continued tracking the system as a tropical depression until it dissipated on August 4.

== Preparations ==
=== China ===
As the storm moved over the East China Sea on July 31, alerts were raised for fishermen off the coast of East China. Strong winds and heavy rains were forecast for Zhejiang Province. Waves up to 6 m (20 ft) were forecast for offshore areas. Throughout the Shanghai region, precautionary steps were taken by local authorities to ensure the safety of residents. Flood control personnel were placed on alert and safety examinations of construction sites were conducted. High-speed rail service was suspended from August 1–3 around Beijing.

=== Japan ===
On July 31, several flights to and from Naha Airport in Okinawa Prefecture and ferry service between local islands were canceled. China Airlines flights from Taiwan to Okinawa were also canceled for August 1. Forecasts indicated that upwards of 300 mm (12 in) of rain could fall from Okinawa northward to Kyushu, prompting flood advisories for the region.

=== South Korea ===
Residents across South Korea received word of the impending effects of Tropical Storm Nakri on July 31. Meteorologists advised of heavy rain and strong winds for the majority of the country as the storm approached. The storm prompted cancellations of 236 flights at Jeju International Airport. By August 2, typhoon alerts were raised across the whole of South Korea; these were later discontinued on August 4.

== Impact ==
In late July, heavy rains from the incipient low to Nakri extended over the southern Philippines. Hardest hit was Misamis Oriental province on Mindanao where flooding and strong winds damaged crops and homes. Agricultural losses in the province reached 5.13 million pesos (US$117,000); 374 homes were affected by flooding in the area. Evacuations took place in Claveria and Jasaan due to swift currents along a rising river. Approximately 70 million pesos (US$1.6 million) was allocated for relief efforts.

=== Japan ===
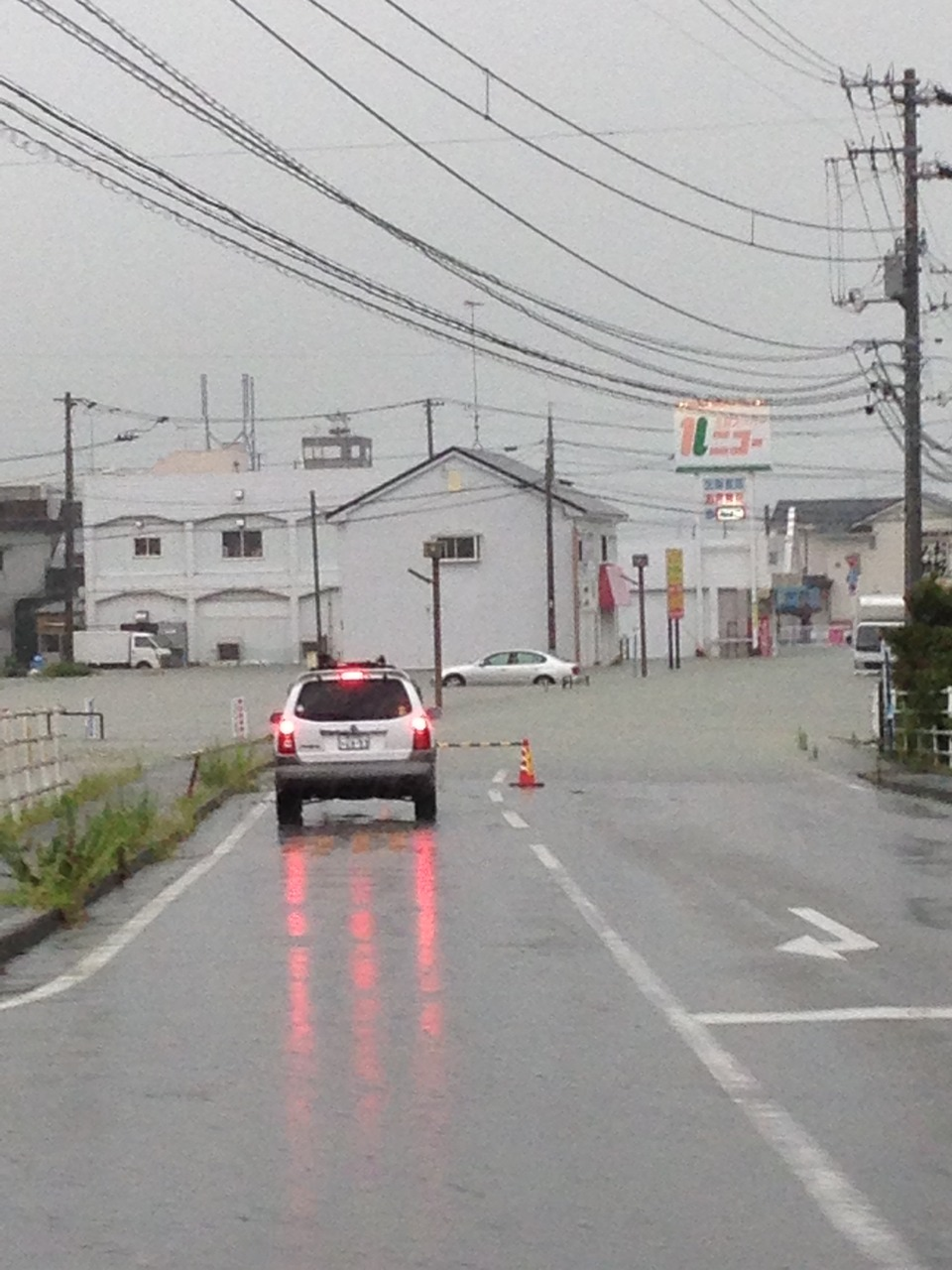
Street flooding in Anan, Tokushima on August 2 as Nakri dropped heavy rains over the region.

Torrential rains affected much of Shikoku, Japan, with many areas reporting more than 1,000 mm (39 in) over a three-day span in early August. The greatest total was in Kochi Prefecture where 1,109.5 mm (43.68 in) was measured in Kami, Kōchi. Rainfall rates on the morning of August 3 reached a tremendous 120 mm (4.7 in) per hour near Kami, with nearby areas reporting rates up to 78 mm (3.1 in) per hour. This resulted in a record-breaking 24 hour total of 600 mm (24 in) for the area. Several cities reported all-time record rainfalls from the storm, including Anan and Sakawa. The Yoshino River overtopped its banks and inundated 247 homes in Tokushima Prefecture; the resulting floods killed one person and injured two others. An estimated 540,000 residents were advised to evacuate due to the risk of landslides and further flooding across Kochi Prefecture. Heavy rains also fell across Kyushu, with values peaking at 446 mm (17.6 in) in Yunomae, Kumamoto.

Landslides in a remote area of Kochi Prefecture stranded 78 children on a camping trip.

In Yamakita, Kanagawa, the normally shallow Nakagawa River abruptly rose to 2 m (6.6 ft) following heavy rains; three people were killed when their car was overwhelmed by the rising water. In Anan, a landslide at a parking lot killed one person while another landslide in Iwakuni, Yamaguchi killed a man in his home.

=== South Korea ===
Tropical Storm Nakri dropped record-breaking rains over southern area of South Korea, especially on Jeju Island which received more than 1,500 mm (59 in). On August 3 alone, 1,182 mm (46.5 in) fell on the island, comparable to the average rainfall which the area sees during the entire year. These rains triggered widespread flooding across the nation. In Cheongdo County, seven died in a flood-related accident in Cheongdo Valley when their vehicle was swept away.

In many areas, the storm alleviated a heat wave that brought temperatures of up to 40 °C (104 °F) to the nation.

Powerful winds accompanied the storm, peaking at 151 km/h (94 mph) on Jeju Island. In Seogwipo, a man was hospitalized after the windows of his home shattered. Approximately 1,600 residences briefly lost power on August 2 on the island. Throughout southwestern areas of the country, gale-force winds downed trees, power lines, and damaged buildings. Portions of a baseball stadium's roof in Gwangju was torn off and scattered across a nearby highway. In North Gyeongsang Province, a tree fell on several people at a camping site, killing two and injuring two others. Airborne debris killed one person in South Jeolla Province.

== Aftermath ==
=== Japan ===
The torrential rains from Nakri and the subsequent Typhoon Halong resulted in Kōchi Prefecture seeing its wettest month on record. Some areas in the prefecture received more than 2,000 mm (80 in) during August. The city of Kōchi had its all-time wettest month by August 20, with 1,400 mm (56 in); records in the city extend to 1886. The tremendous rainfall left soil overly saturated and on August 20, a heavy thunderstorm triggered a series of devastating landslides near Hiroshima. The disaster killed 74 people and injured 44 others.

== See also ==
- Weather of 2014
- Tropical cyclones in 2014
- List of wettest tropical cyclones in South Korea
- Typhoon Rusa (2002)
- Typhoon Halong (2014)
