= Cyclone Ian =

Tropical cyclone

Severe Tropical Cyclone Ian
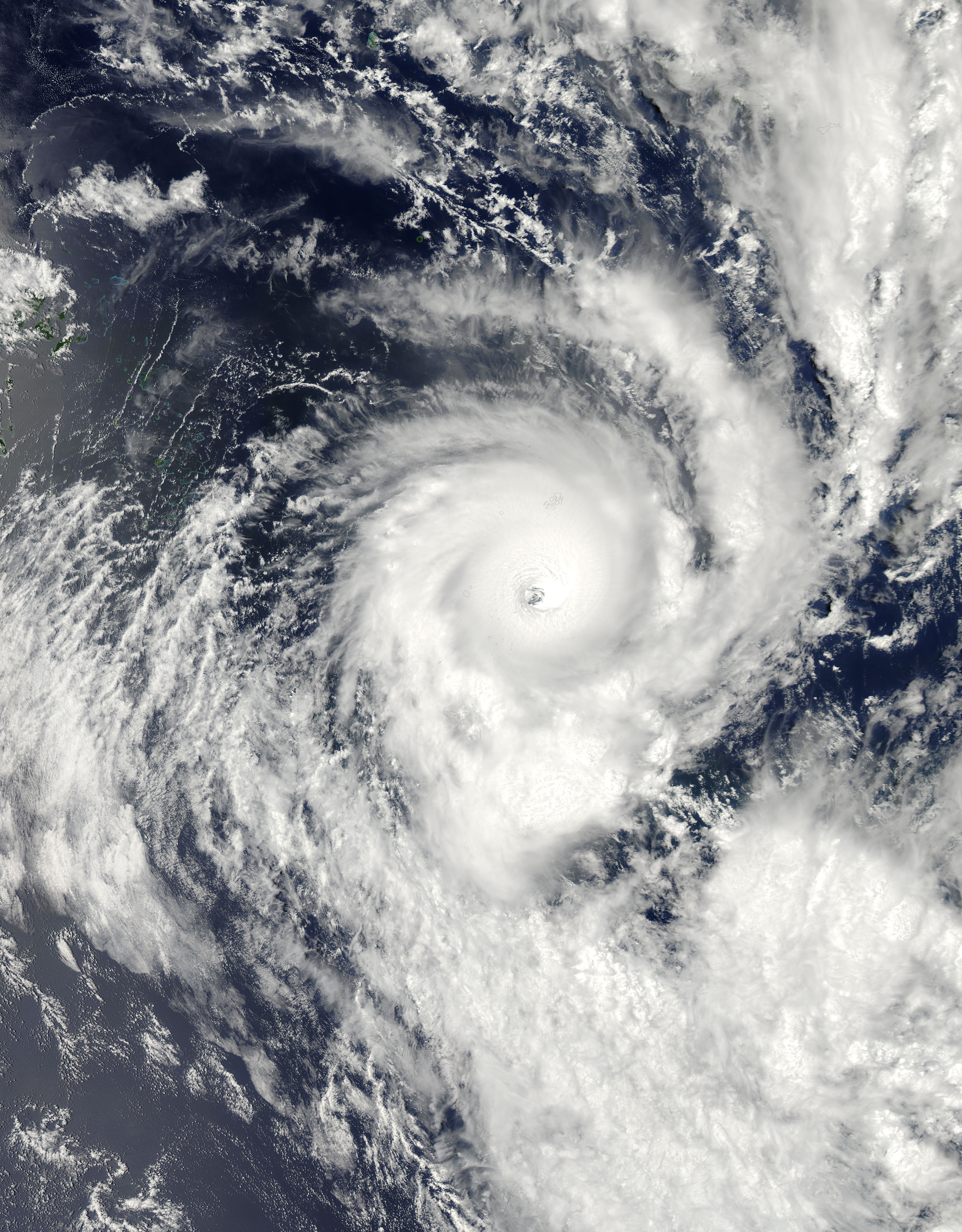
- Cyclone Ian on January 11

Meteorological history
- Formed: January 2, 2014
- Extratropical: January 14, 2014
- Dissipated: January 15, 2014

Category 5 severe tropical cyclone
- 10-minute sustained (FMS)
- Highest winds: 205 km/h (125 mph)
- Highest gusts: 285 km/h (180 mph)
- Lowest pressure: 930 hPa (mbar); 27.46 inHg

Category 4-equivalent tropical cyclone
- 1-minute sustained (SSHWS/JTWC)
- Highest winds: 240 km/h (150 mph)
- Lowest pressure: 926 hPa (mbar); 27.34 inHg

Overall effects
- Fatalities: 1 direct
- Damage: $120 million (2014 USD)
- Areas affected: Fiji, Tonga
- IBTrACS
- Part of the 2013–14 South Pacific cyclone season

Severe Tropical Cyclone Ian was a category 4 tropical cyclone that formed on January 2, 2014, and dissipated to an extratropical cyclone on January 15, 2014. Areas affected by the tropical cyclone include Fiji and Tonga. In Tonga, Ian caused destruction in the Ha'apai islands, with severely injured and one fatality. Damages caused by the cyclone was $120 million (2014 USD).

== Meteorological history ==
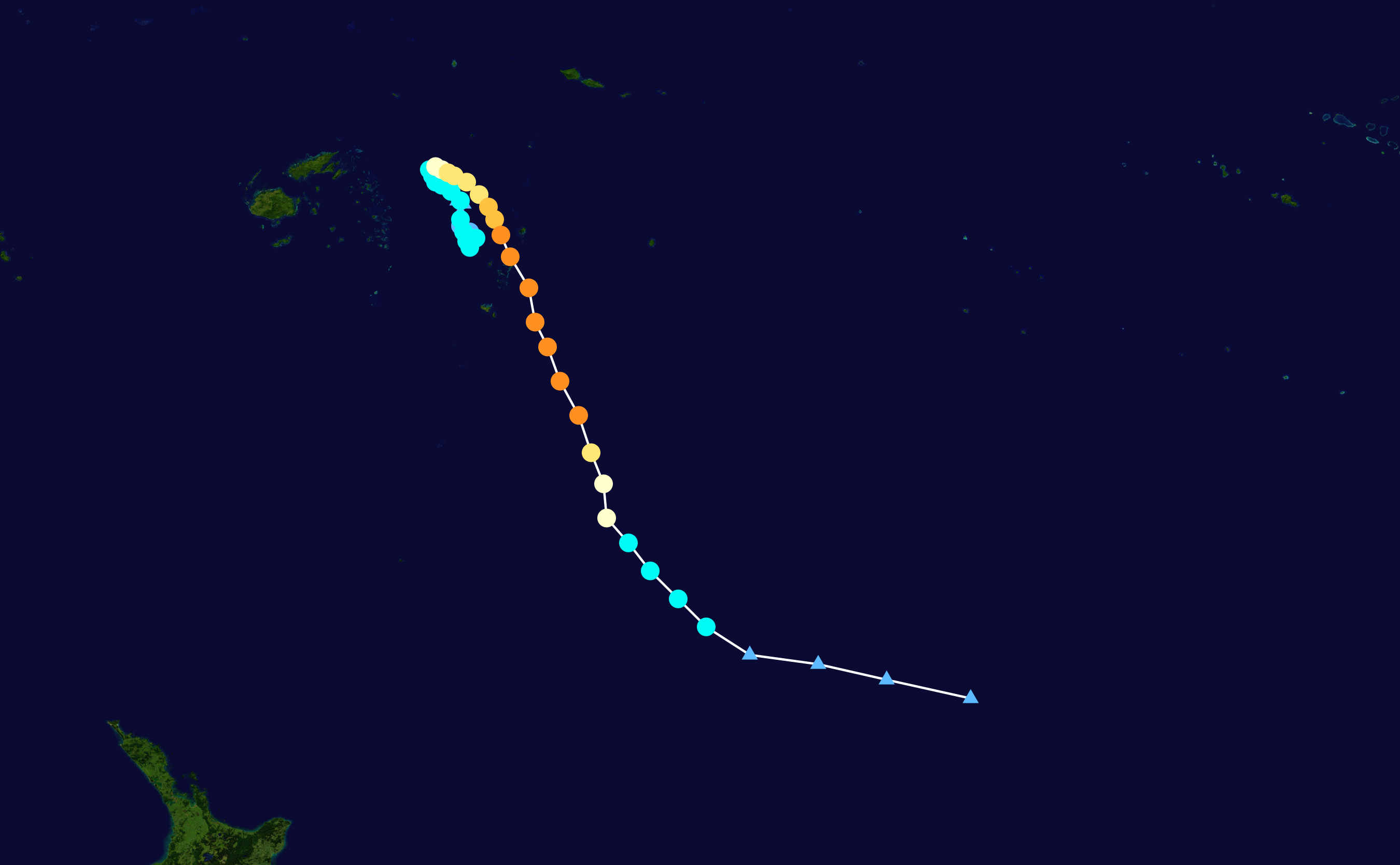
Map plotting the storm's track and intensity, according to the Saffir–Simpson scale Map key Saffir–Simpson scale Tropical depression (≤38 mph, ≤62 km/h) Tropical storm (39–73 mph, 63–118 km/h) Category 1 (74–95 mph, 119–153 km/h) Category 2 (96–110 mph, 154–177 km/h) Category 3 (111–129 mph, 178–208 km/h) Category 4 (130–156 mph, 209–251 km/h) Category 5 (≥157 mph, ≥252 km/h) Unknown Storm type Tropical cyclone Subtropical cyclone Extratropical cyclone, remnant low, tropical disturbance, or monsoon depression

During January 2, 2014 the Fiji Meteorological Service's Regional Specialized Meteorological Center in Nadi, Fiji (RSMC Nadi) reported that Tropical Disturbance 07F had developed to the southeast of Futuna Island. Over the next day the system gradually developed further underneath an upper level ridge of high pressure, within an area of moderate vertical wind shear, as it slowly moved towards the southwest. RSMC Nadi subsequently classified the disturbance as a tropical depression early on January 4, as the systems low level circulation centre consolidated. Over the next day the system continued to move towards the southwest, before the United States Joint Typhoon Warning Center designated the system as Tropical Cyclone 07P late on January 5. At around this time RSMC Nadi named the system Ian, after it had become a category 1 tropical cyclone on the Australian tropical cyclone intensity scale.

Early on January 8, RSMC Nadi reported that Ian had become a category two tropical cyclone. During that day the systems organization significantly improved with RSMC Nadi reporting at 18:00 UTC that Ian had become a category three severe tropical cyclone. Over the next day the system developed a cloud filled eye and intensified into a category 4 severe tropical cyclone. On January 12, as Ian started to weaken RSMC Nadi handed the primary warning responsibility, for issuing warnings over to the Wellington Tropical Cyclone Warning Center.

== Preparations and impact ==
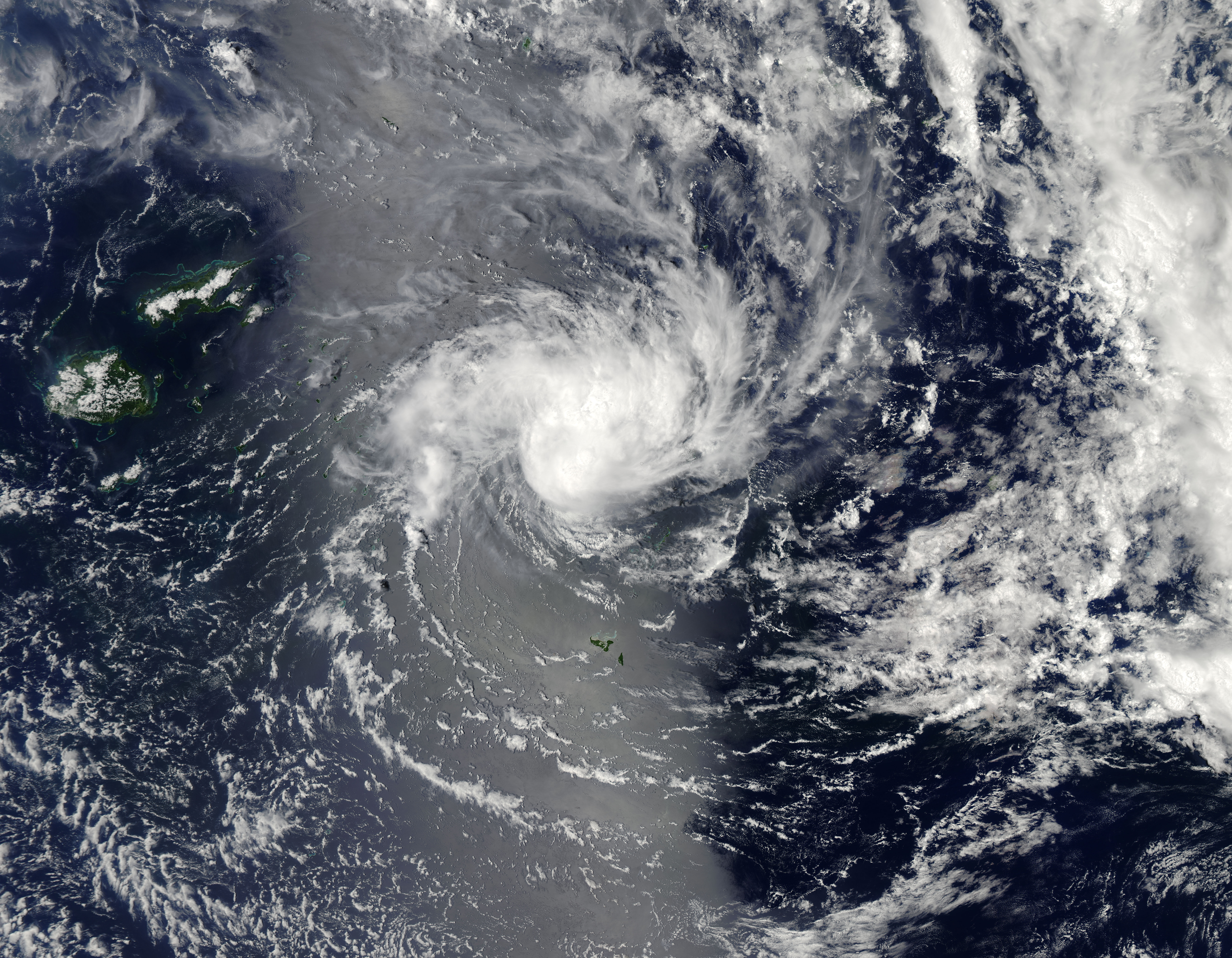
Cyclone Ian intensifying off Tonga on January 6

Late on January 10, a state of emergency was declared by Tongan Prime Minister Lord Tu'ivakano, after Ian intensified into a category five severe tropical cyclone with 287 km/h winds. It struck the Ha'apai islands the next day between Tongatapu and Vava'u, according to the Director of Emergencies Leveni Aho. He also said that 23 islands that are a part of Ha'apai were unreachable by telephone and that patrol boats were traveling from island-to-island to get information. As a result of the cyclone, homes were flattened and at least one person was dead. Ha'apai governor Tu'i Ha'angana said that he was able to see from one side of the island to the other and "that's how devastated it is." By 13 January, contact with the islands was restored.

The electrical grid on Ha'apai sustained tremendous damage, with 90 percent of power lines being lost or severely damaged. Approximately 1,000 customers lost power during the storm. Estimates placed the cost to repair the system at NZ$4 million (US$3.5 million). By January 23, only 100 residences had power back and Tonga Power Limited (TPL) stated it could take a further two months to fully restore the system. In addition to the severe disruption to power, 80–90 percent of the region's water supply was lost. Most residents in Ha'apai rely on rain water collection, and the collection tanks were largely destroyed by the storm. The nation's tourism industry also experienced moderate to severe losses, with damage to facilities amounting to T$1.6 million (US$861,000). Throughout the archipelago, 1,130 buildings were affected, half of which were completely destroyed. Of those structures not destroyed, 34% sustained major damage, including 13 schools. Approximately 2,300 people were left homeless by the storm.

Total damage from the cyclone amounted to be US$120 million.

== Aftermath ==
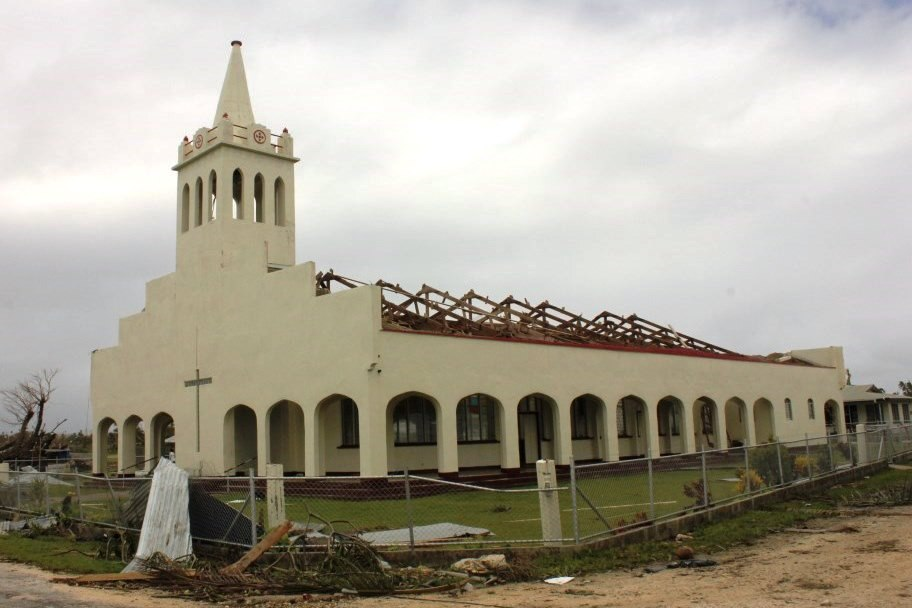
This church on Lifuka Island had its roof torn off by Cyclone Ian.

In the wake of Ian, the ANZ bank donated T$15,000 (US$8,000) to the Tonga Red Cross Society. New Zealand provided NZ$2.27 million (US$1.87 million) in assistance to the TPL. In addition, six electricians, a front end loader, and a tractor were sent to assist in restoration and debris removal efforts. Australia provided A$50,000 in emergency supplies including blankets, water containers, tarpaulins, kitchen sets and hygiene kits. On January 22, the director of Tonga's National Emergency Office, Leveni Aho, announced that the scale of damage was beyond Tonga's ability to handle on its own and made a formal request for internal aid. Following this, China sent 400 tents to house displaced persons while France provided a cargo plane for supply transport. In accordance with the FRANZ agreement, enacted in 1992, the Government of France established an air route from Nuku'alofa to Ha'apai and deployed an aircraft carrier from New Caledonia. The carrier, loaded with supplies from the French Red Cross, arrived in Tonga on January 17. The Government of Turkey made a contribution of US$50,000 to assist Tonga with relief operations. The Japanese Government provided 600 jerrycans and 30 water tanks (3,700 litre capacity), collectively worth ¥13 million ($127,000 USD). Recovery from the cyclone was slow with over 80 families still living in tents over a year after the system had affected the islands.

== See also ==
- Weather of 2014
- Tropical cyclones in 2014
- Cyclone Hina (1997)
- Cyclone Waka (2001)
- Cyclone Percy (2005)
- Cyclone Pam (2015)
