= Tropical cyclones in 2014 =

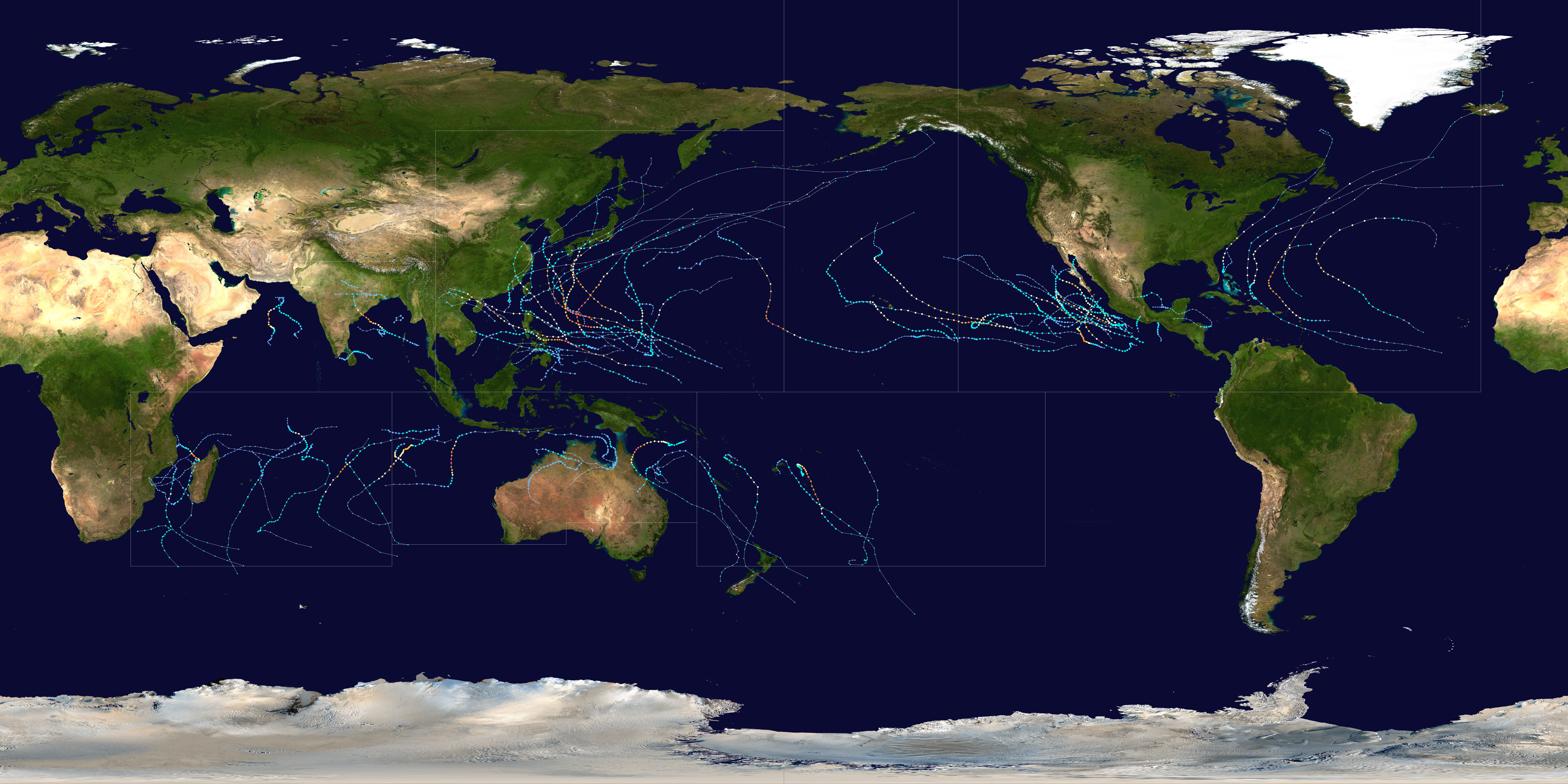
- Year summary map

Year boundaries
- First system: Ian
- Formed: January 2, 2014
- Last system: Jangmi
- Dissipated: January 1, 2015

Strongest system
- Name: Vongfong
- Lowest pressure: 900 mbar (hPa); 26.58 inHg

Longest lasting system
- Name: Gillian
- Duration: 21 days

Year statistics
- Total systems: 117
- Named systems: 78
- Total fatalities: 891 total
- Total damage: $28 billion (2014 USD)
Related articles
- 2014 Atlantic hurricane season
- 2014 Pacific hurricane season
- 2014 Pacific typhoon season
- 2014 North Indian Ocean cyclone season
- 2013–14 South-West Indian Ocean cyclone season
- 2014–15 South-West Indian Ocean cyclone season
- 2013–14 Australian region cyclone season
- 2014–15 Australian region cyclone season
- 2013–14 South Pacific cyclone season
- 2014–15 South Pacific cyclone season

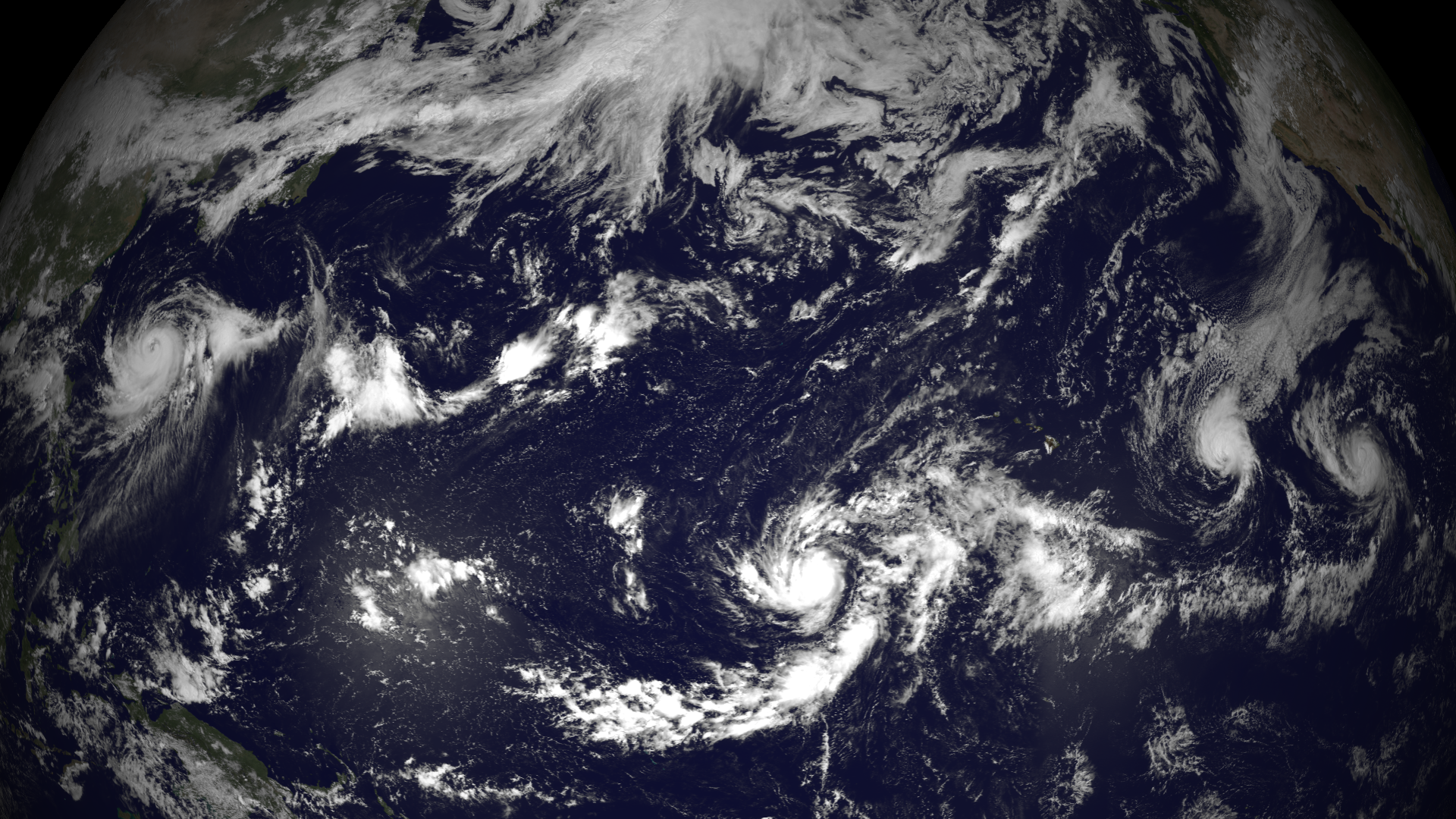
A train of four storms in the Northern Pacific on August 6; shown from left to right are Typhoon Halong, Hurricane Genevieve, Hurricane Iselle, and Hurricane Julio

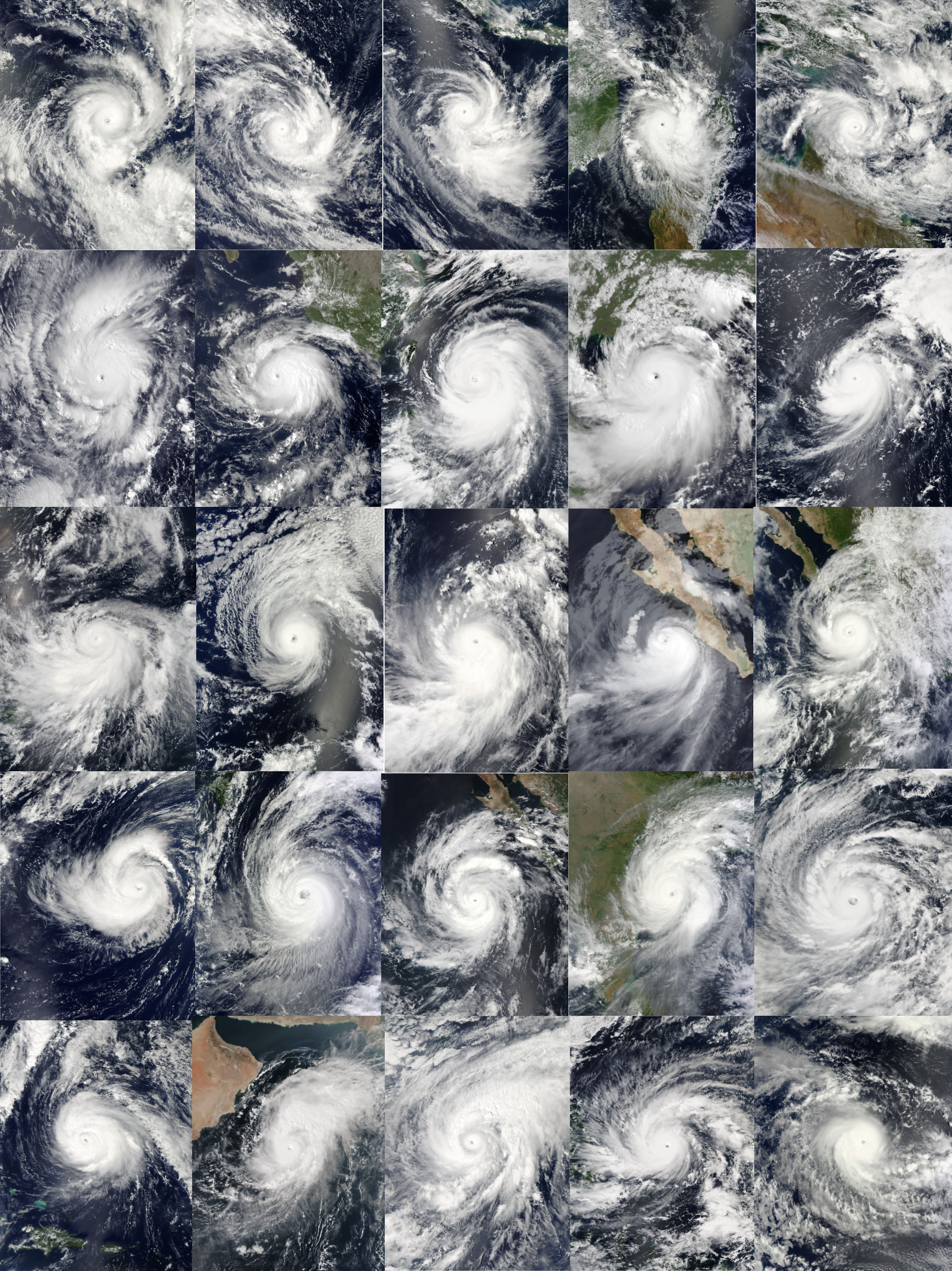
Satellite photos of 25 tropical cyclones worldwide that reached at least Category 3 on the Saffir–Simpson scale during 2014, from Ian in January to Kate in December.

During 2014, tropical cyclones formed within seven different tropical cyclone basins, located within various parts of the Atlantic, Pacific and Indian Oceans. During the year, a total of 117 tropical cyclones had formed this year to date. 79 tropical cyclones had been named by either a Regional Specialized Meteorological Center (RSMC) or a Tropical Cyclone Warning Center (TCWC). The strongest of these tropical cyclones was Typhoon Vongfong, which strengthened to a minimum barometric pressure of 900 mbar (hPa; 26.58 inHg) before striking the east coast of Japan. The costliest and deadliest tropical cyclone in the year was Typhoon Rammasun, which struck China in July, causing US$8.08 billion in damage. Rammasun killed 222 people; 106 in Philippines, 88 in China and 28 in Vietnam.

The most active basin in the year was the Western Pacific, which documented 23 named systems, while the Eastern Pacific, despite only amounting to 22 named systems, was its basin's most active since 1992. Conversely, both the North Atlantic hurricane and North Indian Ocean cyclone had a below average season numbering 9 and 3, respectively. Activity across the southern hemisphere's three basins—South-West Indian, Australian, and South Pacific—was spread evenly, with each region recording seven named storms apiece. Throughout the year, a twenty-four Category 3 tropical cyclones formed, including twenty-two tropical cyclones of Category 4 and 5, while there ten Category 5 tropical cyclones, the third-most intense tropical cyclone activity on record, only behind with 1997 and 2018. The accumulated cyclone energy (ACE) index for the 2014 (seven basins combined), as calculated by Colorado State University (CSU) was 724 units.

Tropical cyclones are primarily monitored by a group of ten warning centers, which have been designated as a Regional Specialized Meteorological Centre (RSMC) or a Tropical Cyclone Warning Center (TCWC) by the World Meteorological Organization. These are the United States National Hurricane Center (NHC) and Central Pacific Hurricane Center, the Japan Meteorological Agency (JMA), the Indian Meteorological Department (IMD), Météo-France (MFR), Indonesia's Badan Meteorologi, Klimatologi, dan Geofisika, the Australian Bureau of Meteorology (BOM), Papua New Guinea's National Weather Service, the Fiji Meteorological Service (FMS) as well as New Zealand's MetService. Other notable warning centers include the Philippine Atmospheric, Geophysical, and Astronomical Services Administration (PAGASA), the United States Joint Typhoon Warning Center (JTWC), and the Brazilian Navy Hydrographic Center (BNHC).

== Global atmospheric and hydrological conditions ==
During January 2014, after surveying various climate models, the World Meteorological Organization warned that there was an enhanced possibility of a weak El Niño event happening during 2014. Over the next few months the climate of the Pacific Ocean started to exhibit features that suggested the impending onset of an El Niño event. Over the ocean, these features included: a rapid fall of the sea level in western Micronesia, as well as a large area of enhanced sea surface temperatures that were present at low latitudes near the International Date Line. In the atmosphere these features included persistent westerly winds at equatorial latitudes, which were displaced eastwards towards the Marshall Islands. A large area of atmospheric convection was present at a low latitude near the International Date Line, in association with the development of an unusual amount of early season tropical cyclones near the Marshall Islands. As a result of some of these conditions, an El Niño Watch was issued by the United States Climate Prediction Center (NOAA's CPC) and the International Research Institute for Climate and Society within their March 2014 diagnostic discussion. (Note: An El Niño watch is issued by the Climate Prediction Center when conditions are favourable for the development of an El Niño within the next six months.)

Over the next few months, the atmosphere failed to respond in order to reinforce the developing El Niño, with the monsoon trough remaining weak and tropical cyclone activity slowing, while no episodes of strong westerly winds at a low latitude occurred. Some of the oceanic indicators of El Niño also failed to develop further, with a cooling of sea and sub surface temperatures over the tropical Pacific occurring. However, by the end of 2014, several of the El Niño indexes that were used to judge the state of the ENSO state, indicated that weak El Niño conditions had developed over the Pacific Ocean. As a result, a few of the international meteorological agencies, including the Japan Meteorological Agency and the Hong Kong Observatory reported that an El Niño event had developed during 2014, while others such as the Fiji Meteorological Service considered 2014 to be a near miss. At this time it was thought that the ENSO state would continue to hover at the borderline El Niño conditions, before easing back into neutral ENSO conditions.

== Summary ==
=== North Atlantic Ocean ===
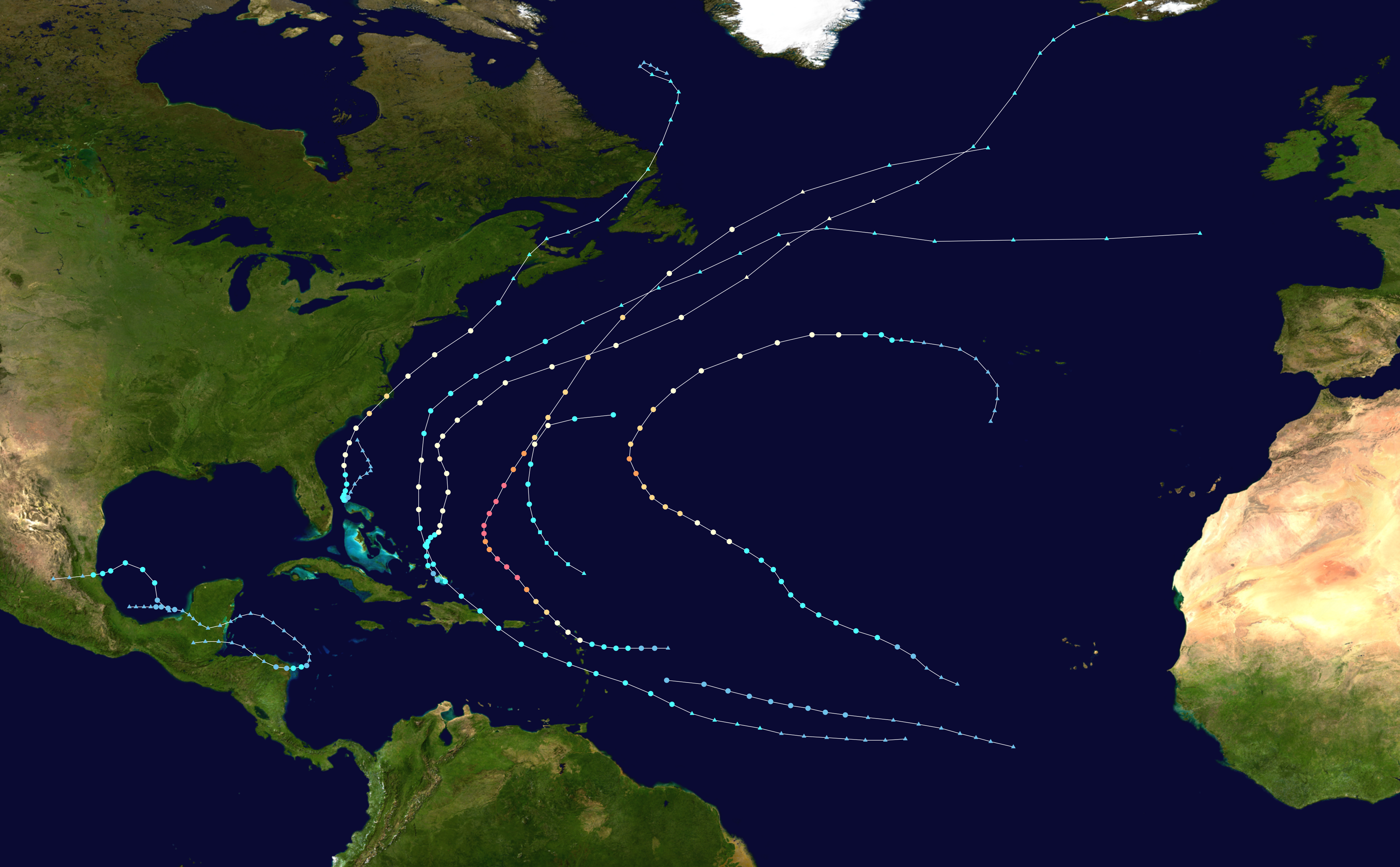
2014 Atlantic hurricane season summary map

The Atlantic hurricane season officially began on June 1, 2014. It was a below average season in which nine tropical cyclones formed. Eight of the nine designated cyclones attained tropical storm status, the fewest since the 1997 Atlantic hurricane season. Of the eight tropical storms, six reached at least Category 1 hurricane intensity. The 2014 season extended the period without major hurricane landfalls in the United States to nine years, with the last such system being Hurricane Wilma in 2005. The lack of activity was attributed to an atmospheric circulation that favored dry, sinking air over the Atlantic Ocean and strong wind shear over the Caribbean Sea. Additionally, sea surface temperatures were near-average. A few notable events occurred during the season. Arthur made landfall between Cape Lookout and Cape Hatteras as a Category 2 hurricane, becoming the first U.S. landfalling cyclone of that intensity since Hurricane Ike in 2008. Arthur also became the earliest known hurricane to strike the North Carolina coastline on record, doing so on July 4. In October, Fay became the first hurricane to make landfall on Bermuda since Emily in 1987. With Gonzalo striking the island only four days later, 2014 became the first season on record in which more than one hurricane struck Bermuda. Four hurricanes and two tropical storms made landfall during the season and caused 21 deaths and at least $233 million in damage. Hurricane Cristobal also caused fatalities, though it did not strike land. The Atlantic hurricane season officially ended on November 30, 2014.

Tropical cyclogenesis began in early July, with the development of Hurricane Arthur on July 1, ahead of the long-term climatological average of July 9. Early on July 3, the system intensified into a hurricane, preceding the climatological average of August 10. Later that month, a tropical depression developed over the eastern Atlantic, but dissipated after only two days. There were also two tropical cyclones in August, with the development of hurricanes Bertha and Cristobal. Despite being the climatological peak of hurricane season, only two additional systems originated in September – Tropical Storm Dolly and Hurricane Edouard. In October, three storms developed, including hurricane Fay and Gonzalo and Tropical Storm Hanna. The most intense tropical cyclone – Hurricane Gonzalo – peaked with maximum sustained winds of 145 mph (235 km/h) on October 16 which is a Category 4 on the Saffir–Simpson hurricane wind scale. It was the first Category 4 hurricane since Hurricane Ophelia in 2011. The final tropical cyclone of the season was Hanna, which dissipated on October 28.

The season's activity was reflected with an Accumulated Cyclone Energy (ACE) rating of 67. This was nearly double that of the previous season, but still well below the 1981–2010 median of 92. The ACE value in October was higher than August and September combined, which has not occurred since 1963.

=== Eastern & Central Pacific Oceans ===
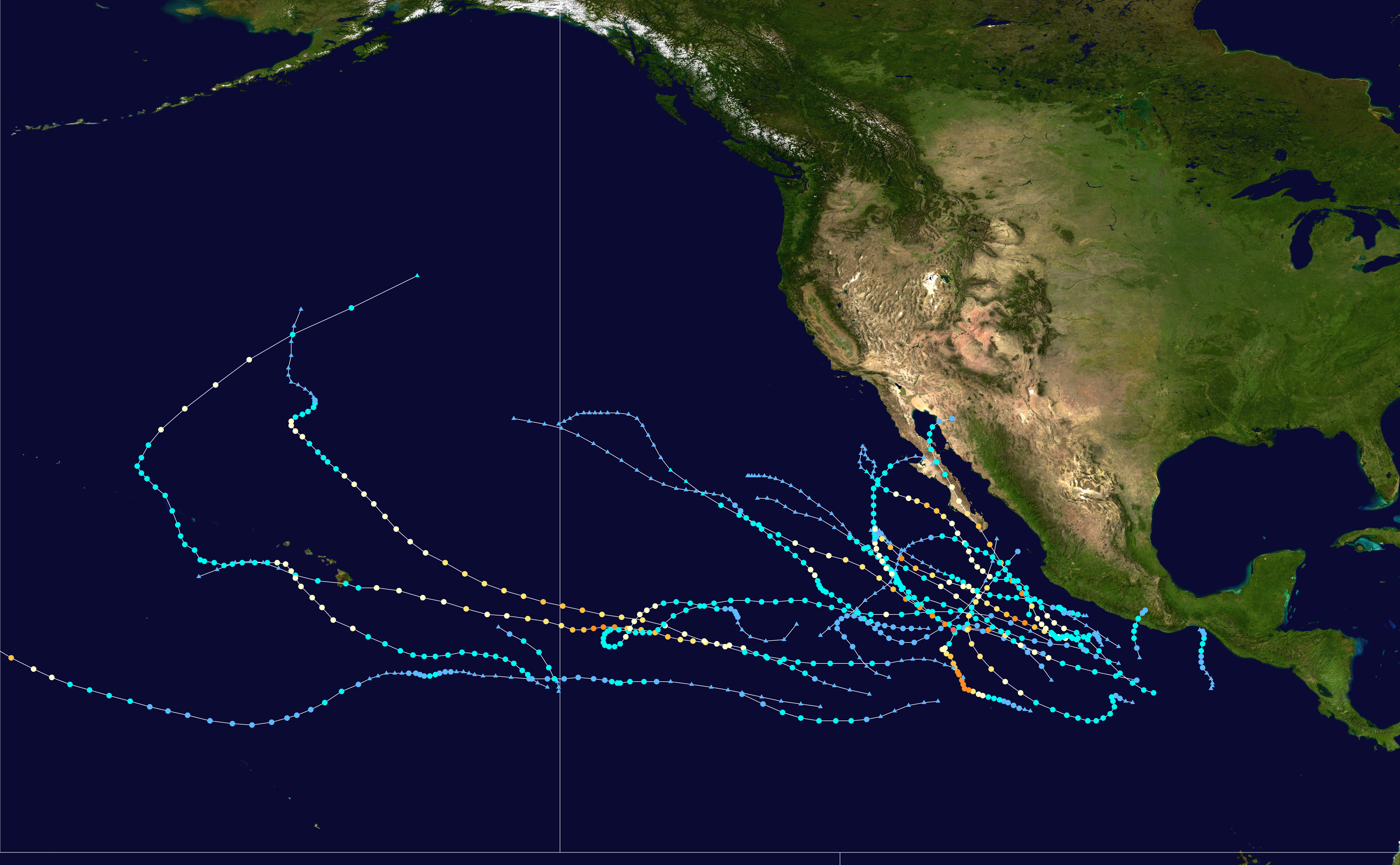
2014 Pacific hurricane season summary map

The season's first named storm, Amanda, developed on May 23, shortly after the official start to the Pacific hurricane season on May 15. On May 24, the system intensified into a hurricane, transcending the climatological average date of June 26 for the first hurricane. The next day, Amanda attained major hurricane status, over a month sooner than the average date of July 19. Owing to Amanda's extreme intensity the ACE value for May was the highest on record in the East Pacific at 18.6 units, eclipsing the previous record of 17.9 units set in 2001. Hurricane Cristina became the second's major hurricane, the system broke the previous record set by Hurricane Darby in 2010 which reached major status on June 25. However, this record was broken by Hurricane Blanca in 2015 which reached major status on June 3. Through June 14, the seasonal ACE reached its highest level since 1971, when reliable records began, for so early in the season. By the end of June, the ACE total remained at 230% of the normal value, before subsiding to near-average levels to end July. By late July, the basin became rejuvenated, with 3 systems forming during the final 10 days of the month. Activity in August ramped up significantly, with four hurricanes developing during the month, two of which became major hurricanes, excluding Iselle and Genevieve, which formed in July, but became a major hurricane during August. By the end of August, ACE values rose to 60% above the 30-year average.

Continued, though less prolific, activity extended through September with four hurricanes developing that month. ACE values remained 45% above-average by the end of the month. Following the rapid intensification of Hurricane Simon to a Category 3 hurricane during the afternoon of October 4, the 2014 season featured the highest number of major hurricanes in the Eastern Pacific basin since the advent of satellite imagery. With eight such storms east of 140°W, the year tied with the record set in the 1992 season. However, this record was surpassed by the 2015 Pacific hurricane season.

== Systems ==
=== January ===
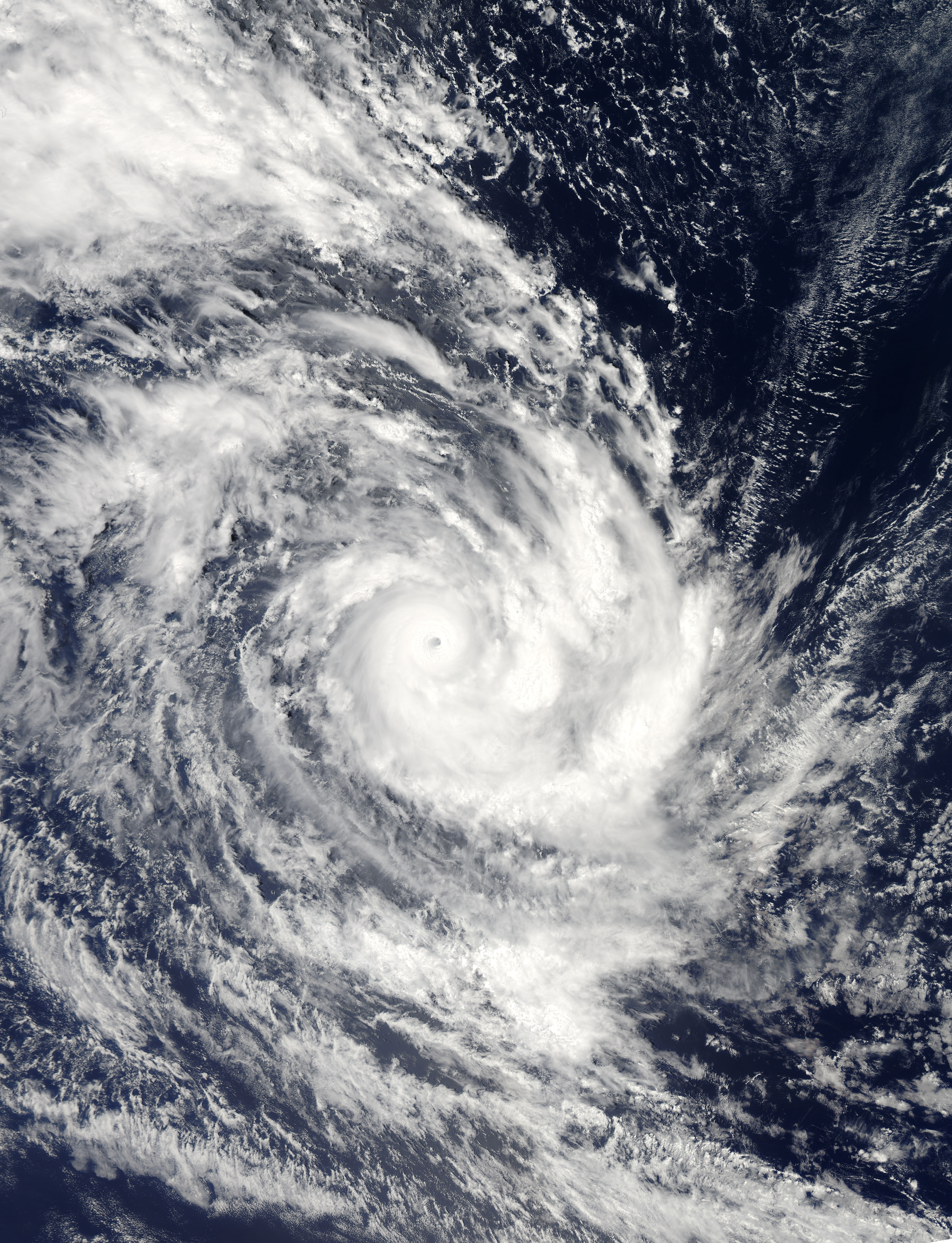
Cyclone Colin

In January, the Intertropical Convergence Zone (ITCZ), which allows for the formation of tropical waves, is located in the Southern Hemisphere, remaining there until May. This limits Northern Hemisphere cyclone formation to comparatively rare non-tropical sources. In addition, the month's climate is also an important factor. In the Southern Hemisphere basins, January, at the height of the austral summer, is the most active month by cumulative number of storms since records began. Of the four Northern Hemisphere basins, none is very active in January, as the month is during the winter, but the most active basin is the Western Pacific, which occasionally sees weak tropical storms form during the month.

In 2014, January saw eighteen tropical cyclones form, of which eight were named. This month started with Ian bringing damages in Fiji and Tonga. Adding on, Lingling was the first disturbance in the West Pacific, affecting Philippines. Colin became the strongest tropical cyclone in the month of January this 2014, but it stayed well from land. 14 more disturbances formed on different basins, 6 are named by their respective meteorological agencies.

Tropical cyclones formed in January 2014
Storm name	Dates active	Max wind km/h (mph)	Pressure (hPa)	Areas affected	Damage (USD)	Deaths	Refs
Ian	January 2–15	205 (125)	930	Fiji, Tonga	$48 million	1	
BOB 01	January 4–7	40 (25)	1004	India, Sri Lanka	None	None	
05	January 7–10	55 (35)	997	Madagascar	None	None	
Colin	January 9–14	205 (125)	915	None	None	None	
Lingling (Agaton)	January 10–20	65 (40)	1002	Philippines	$12.6 million	70	
05U	January 10–23	Unknown	Unknown	Northern Territory, Western Australia	None	None	
June	January 13–19	75 (45)	990	Solomon Islands, New Caledonia, New Zealand	Minor	1	
Deliwe	January 14–22	85 (50)	990	Madagascar, Mozambique	Unknown	2	
08	January 16–20	35 (25)	1004	Madagascar	None	None	
09F	January 21–24	—N/a	1004	Cook Islands, Niue, Tonga	None	None	
10F	January 22–24	—N/a	1004	Solomon Islands, Vanuatu	None	None	
09	January 24 – 31	45 (30)	1002	Mozambique	None	None	
Dylan	January 24 – 31	110 (70)	974	Queensland	Minor	None	
Kajiki (Basyang)	January 29–February 1	65 (40)	1000	Philippines	$202 thousand	6	
11F	January 29	—N/a	1000	Fiji	None	None	
Fletcher	January 30–February 12	65 (40)	992	Western Australia, Northern Territory, Queensland	None	None	
Edna	January 31–February 6	95 (60)	985	New Caledonia, New Zealand, Queensland	None	None	
09U	January 31–February 13	100 (65)	982	Western Australia, Northern Territory	None	None	

=== February ===
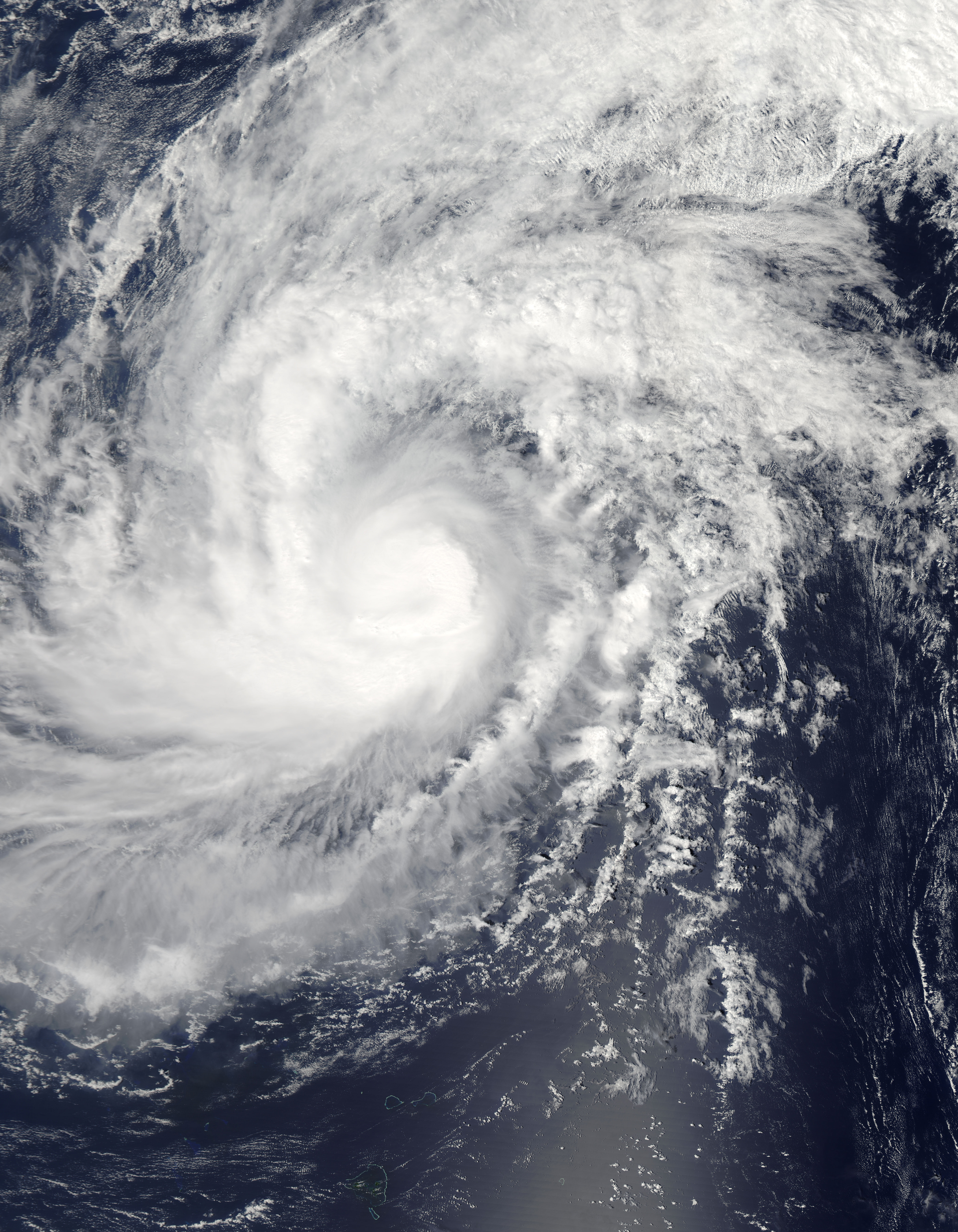
Typhoon Faxai

In the month of February, 11 systems formed, of which 6 were named. Typhoon Faxai became the strongest tropical cyclone of the month, affecting the Caroline Islands and the Mariana Islands. Edilson brought considerable damages and heavy rainfall to Mauritius and Réunion, and Guito did the same to Mozambique and Madagascar.

Tropical cyclones formed in February 2014
Storm name	Dates active	Max wind km/h (mph)	Pressure (hPa)	Areas affected	Damage (USD)	Deaths	Refs
Edilson	February 3–7	105 (65)	978	Mauritius, Réunion	None	None	
Fobane	February 5–16	110 (70)	975	None	None	None	
11U	February 7–10	Not specified	994	Northern Territory	None	None	
13F	February 16–19	Not specified	1003	Vanuatu, Fiji	None	None	
Guito	February 17–21	110 (70)	980	Mozambique, Madagascar	None	None	
14F	February 23–26	Not specified	1002	Vanuatu, Fiji	None	None	
Kofi	February 24–March 4	100 (65)	980	Fiji, Tonga	None	None	
13	February 25–March 1	75 (45)	993	None	None	None	
Hadi	February 26–March 20	75 (45)	992	Solomon Islands, Vanuatu, Queensland	None	None	
Faxai	February 27–March 5	120 (75)	975	Caroline Islands, Mariana Islands	Minimal	1	
12U	February 28–March 2	Not specified	Not specified	None	None	None	

=== March ===
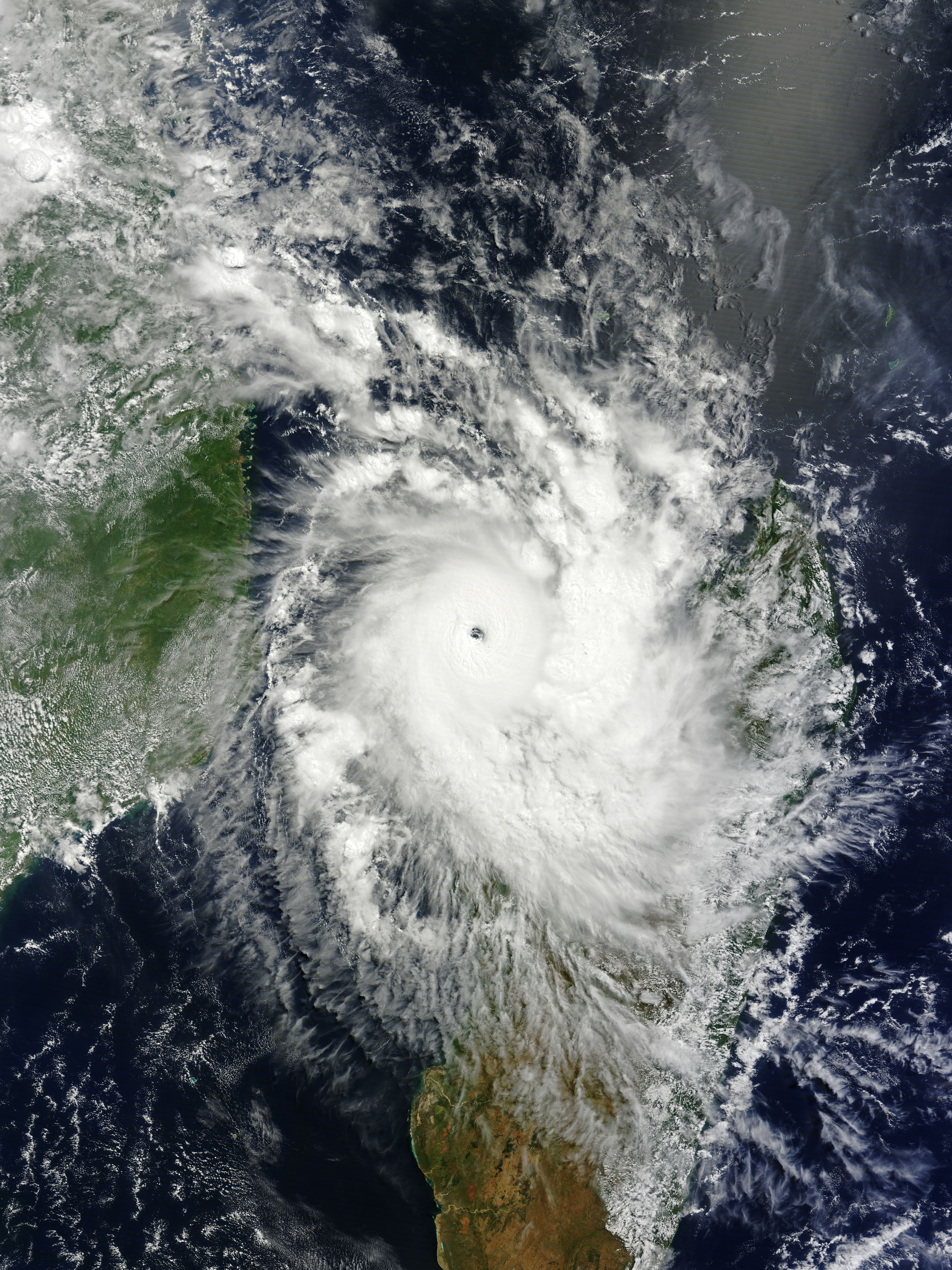
Cyclone Hellen

In the month of March, 8 systems formed, of which 5 were named. Cyclone Hellen was one of the most powerful tropical cyclones in the Mozambique Channel on record, as well as the most intense of the 2013–14 South-West Indian Ocean cyclone season: however, it made landfall on Madagascar with winds of 110 kilometres per hour (68 mph). In the Australian basin, Cyclone Gillian was the second most powerful cyclone of the 2013–14 Australian region cyclone season and the strongest in the basin in the last four years. 17F, Lusi, Mike, and 21F formed in the South Pacific basin while Caloy formed in the West Pacific basin near the Philippines.

Tropical cyclones formed in March 2014
Storm name	Dates active	Max wind km/h (mph)	Pressure (hPa)	Areas affected	Damage (USD)	Deaths	Refs
Gillian	March 6–27	220 (140)	927	Queensland, Northern Territory, East Timor, Indonesia, Christmas Island	Minimal	None	
17F	March 6–8	Not specified	1005	Vanuatu	None	None	
Lusi	March 7–14	150 (90)	960	Vanuatu, Fiji, New Zealand	$3 million	10	
TD	March 11–12	Not specified	1008	Sulawesi	None	None	
Mike	March 12–20	65 (40)	990	Cook Islands	Minimal	None	
21F	March 17–19	45 (30)	998	Cook Islands	None	None	
Caloy	March 17–24	Not specified	1004	Philippines	None	None	
Hellen	March 26–April 5	230 (145)	915	Mozambique, Comoro Islands, Madagascar	Unknown	8	

=== April ===
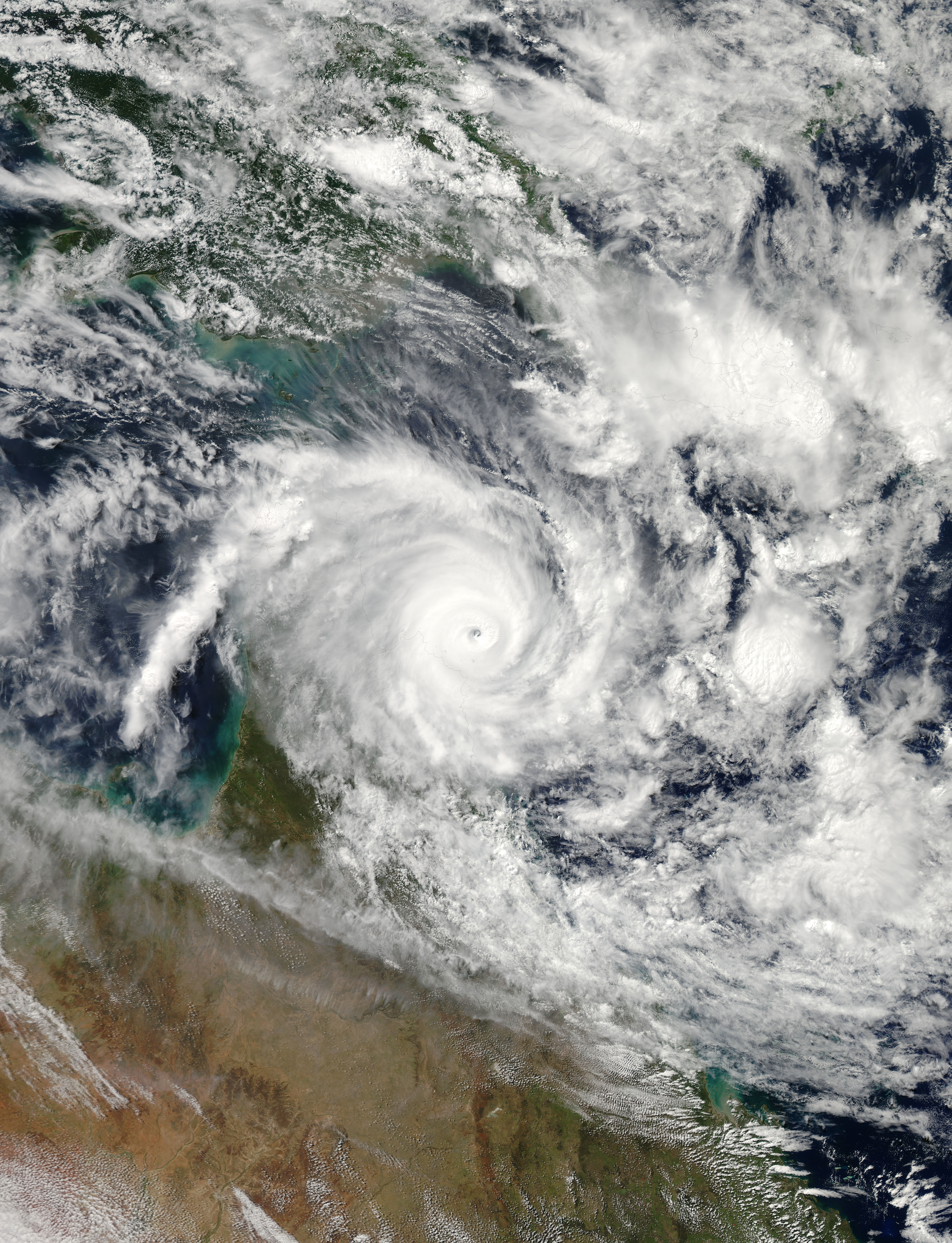
Cyclone Ita

In the month of April, 7 systems formed, the second-least active month of this year; however, 5 storms were named. Severe Tropical Cyclone Ita was the strongest tropical cyclone in the Australian region by minimum central pressure since George in 2007, and since Monica in 2006 by wind speed. In the Australian basin, including Ita, 2 more systems formed: Jack and a weak 17U. Ivanoe formed in the South-West Indian Ocean basin, while Peipah (Domeng), a weak tropical depression, and Tapah existed in the West Pacific basin.

Tropical cyclones formed in April 2014
Storm name	Dates active	Max wind km/h (mph)	Pressure (hPa)	Areas affected	Damage (USD)	Deaths	Refs
Ita	April 1–14	220 (140)	922	Solomon Islands, Papua New Guinea, Queensland, New Zealand	$1.15 billion	40	
Peipah (Domeng)	April 2–15	65 (40)	998	Caroline Islands	None	None	
Ivanoe	April 3–6	85 (50)	987	None	None	None	
Jack	April 15–22	140 (85)	966	Cocos Islands	None	None	
TD	April 19–21	Not specified	1004	Caroline Islands, Philippines	None	None	
17U	April 21–26	Not specified	1006	None	None	None	
Tapah	April 27–May 2	95 (60)	985	None	None	None	

=== May ===
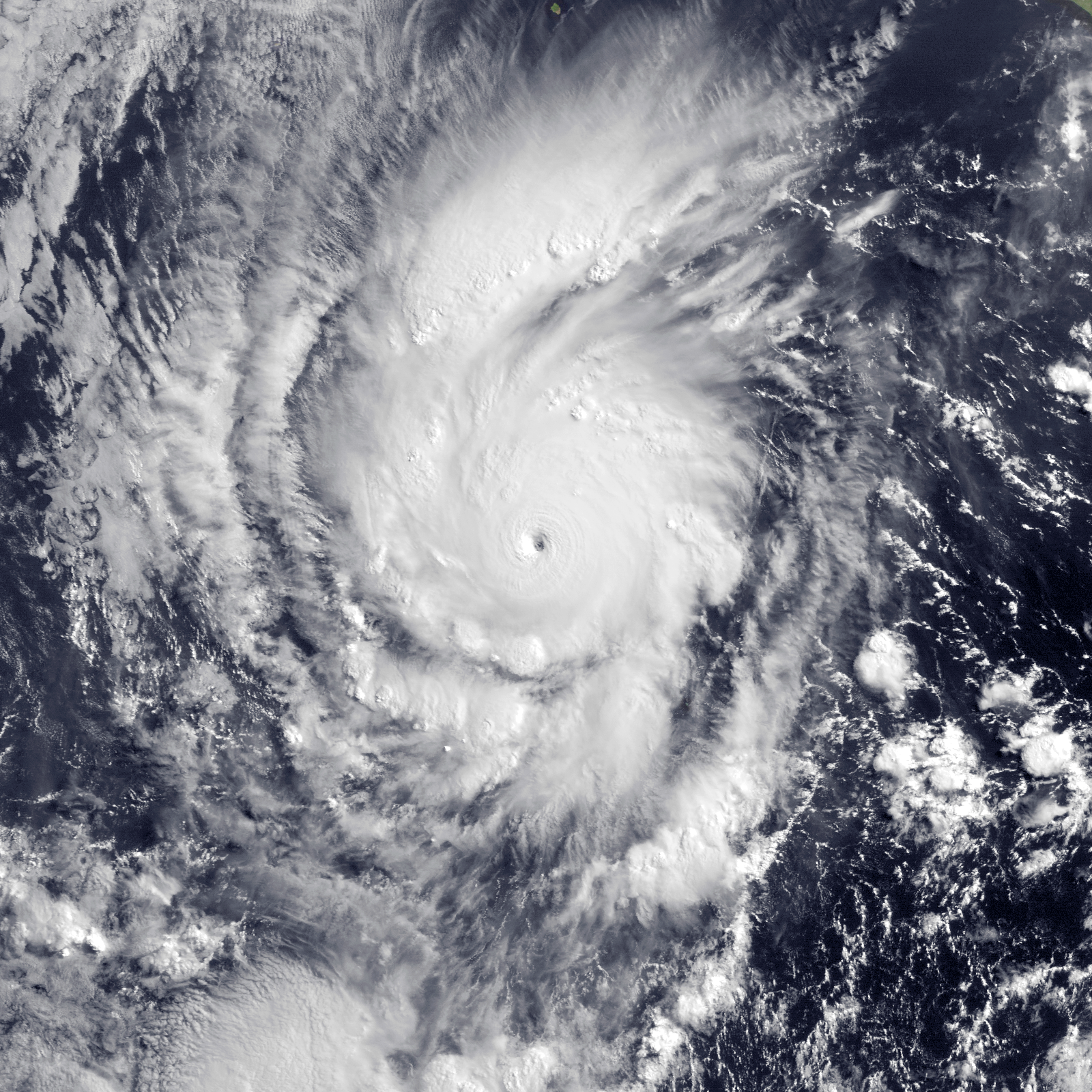
Hurricane Amanda

May of 2014 was one of the least active months in the history of worldwide tropical cyclogenesis despite an extant El Niño event, with two tropical cyclones forming. One of them was BOB 02, a depression that brought relief to Odisha, which had been suffering from a heat wave that claimed 22 lives. Coastal areas previously reporting temperatures near 40 °C (104 °F) fell below 30 °C (86 °F) during the system's passage. The other was Amanda, which was the strongest Eastern Pacific tropical cyclone ever recorded in the month of May, and it is also the strongest cyclone of the month with a wind speed of 135 knots (155 mph) and a pressure of 932 hectopascals (27.5 inHg).

Tropical cyclones formed in May 2014
Storm name	Dates active	Max wind km/h (mph)	Pressure (hPa)	Areas affected	Damage (USD)	Deaths	Refs
BOB 02	May 21–23	45 (30)	1000	India, Myanmar	Minimal	None	
Amanda	May 22–29	250 (155)	932	Southwestern Mexico, Western Mexico	Minimal	3	

=== June ===
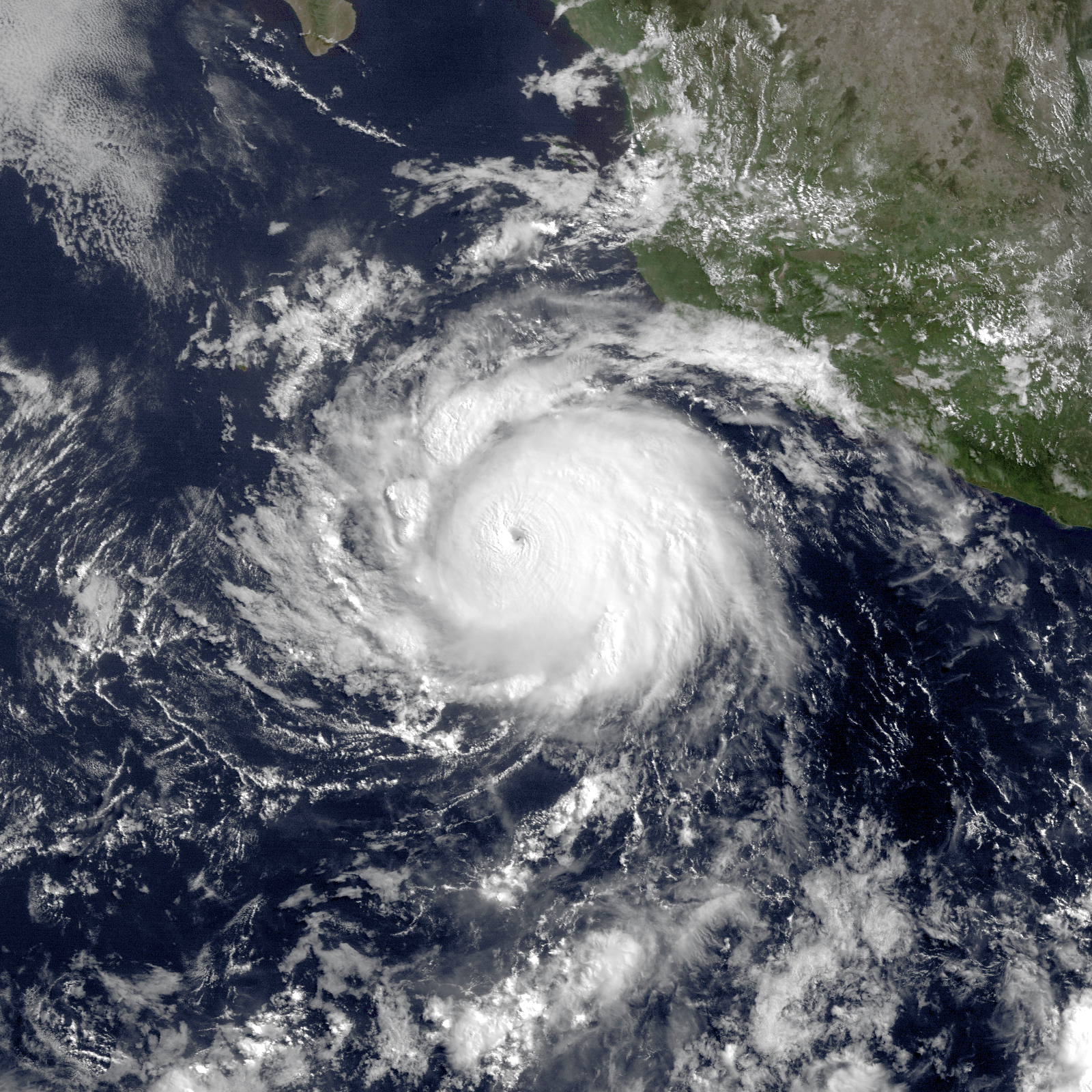
Hurricane Cristina

Tropical cyclones formed in June 2014
Storm name	Dates active	Max wind km/h (mph)	Pressure (hPa)	Areas affected	Damage (USD)	Deaths	Refs
Boris	June 2–4	75 (45)	998	Southwestern Mexico, Guatemala	$54.1 million	6	
Cristina	June 9–15	240 (150)	935	Southwestern Mexico, Western Mexico	Minimal	None	
Mitag (Ester)	June 9–12	75 (45)	994	Philippines, Taiwan, Japan	None	None	
Nanauk	June 10–14	85 (50)	986	Pakistan, Oman	None	None	
Hagibis	June 13–17	75 (45)	996	Philippines, China, Taiwan, Japan	$198 million	None	
Douglas	June 28–July 5	85 (50)	999	None	None	None	
Elida	June 30–July 2	85 (50)	1002	Western Mexico	None	None	

=== July ===
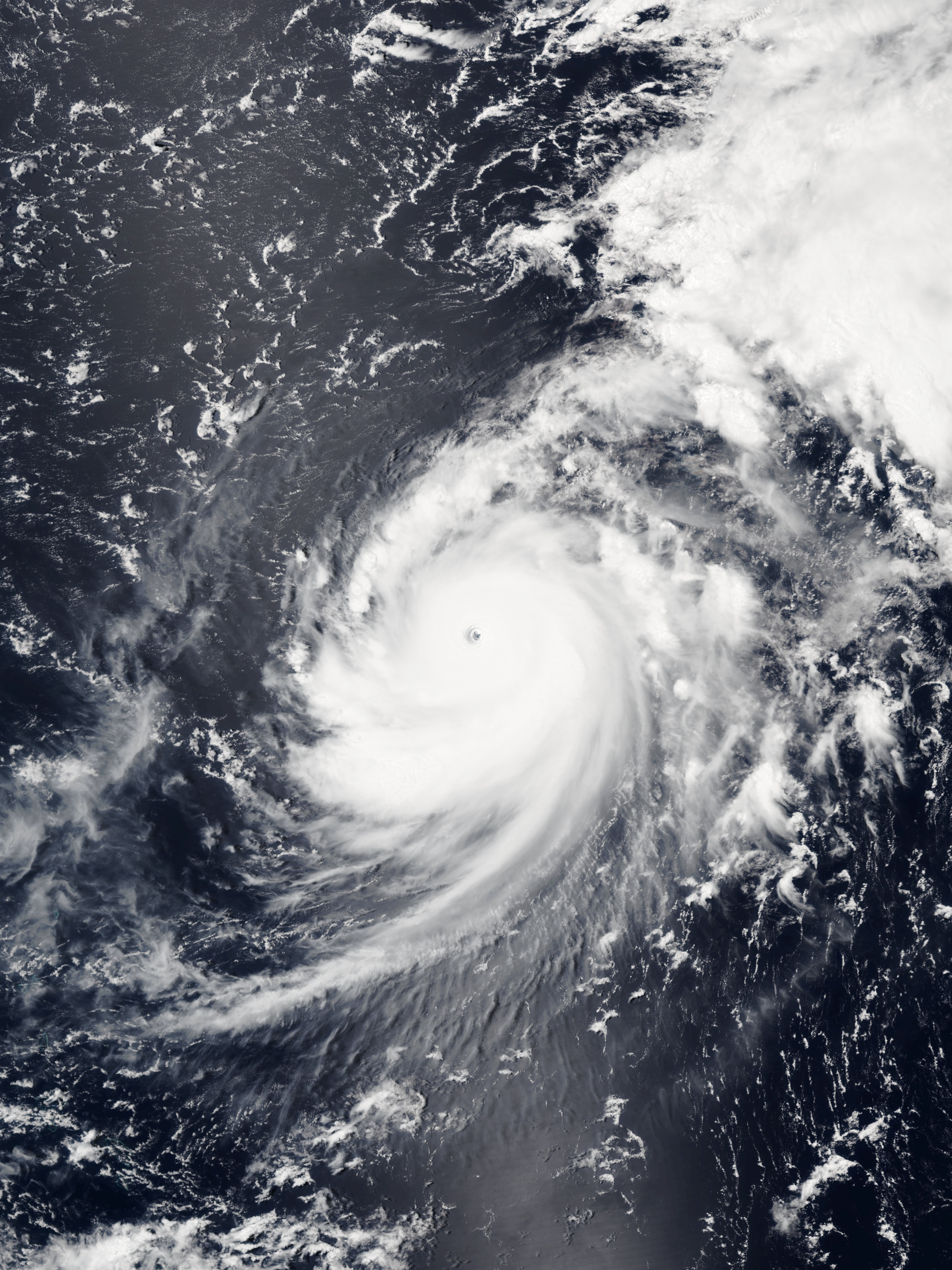
Hurricane Genevieve

Tropical cyclones formed in July 2014
Storm name	Dates active	Max wind km/h (mph)	Pressure (hPa)	Areas affected	Damage (USD)	Deaths	Refs
Arthur	July 1–5	155 (100)	973	The Bahamas, East Coast of the United States, Atlantic Canada	≥ $39.5 million	2	
Neoguri (Florita)	July 2–11	185 (115)	930	Caroline Islands, Guam, Japan	$632 million	3	
Fausto	July 7–9	75 (45)	1004	None	None	None	
Rammasun (Glenda)	July 9–20	165 (105)	935	Caroline Islands, Guam, Philippines, China, Vietnam	$8.03 billion	222	
Matmo (Henry)	July 16–25	130 (80)	965	Philippines, Taiwan, China, Korea	$418 million	65	
Wali	July 17–18	75 (45)	1003	None	None	None	
TD	July 19–22	Not specified	1008	Caroline Islands, Mariana Islands	None	None	
Two	July 21–23	55 (35)	1012	None	None	None	
LAND 01	July 21–23	45 (30)	988	India	Minor	12	
Genevieve	July 25–August 14	205 (125)	915	None	None	None	
Hernan	July 26–29	120 (75)	992	None	None	None	
Halong (Jose)	July 27–August 11	195 (120)	920	Caroline Islands, Mariana Islands, Philippines, Japan, Russia	$72.8 million	12	
Nakri (Inday)	July 28–August 4	100 (65)	980	Guam, Philippines, Japan, East China, South Korea, North Korea	$117 thousand	16	
Iselle	July 31–August 9	220 (140)	947	Hawaii	>$148 million	1	

=== August ===
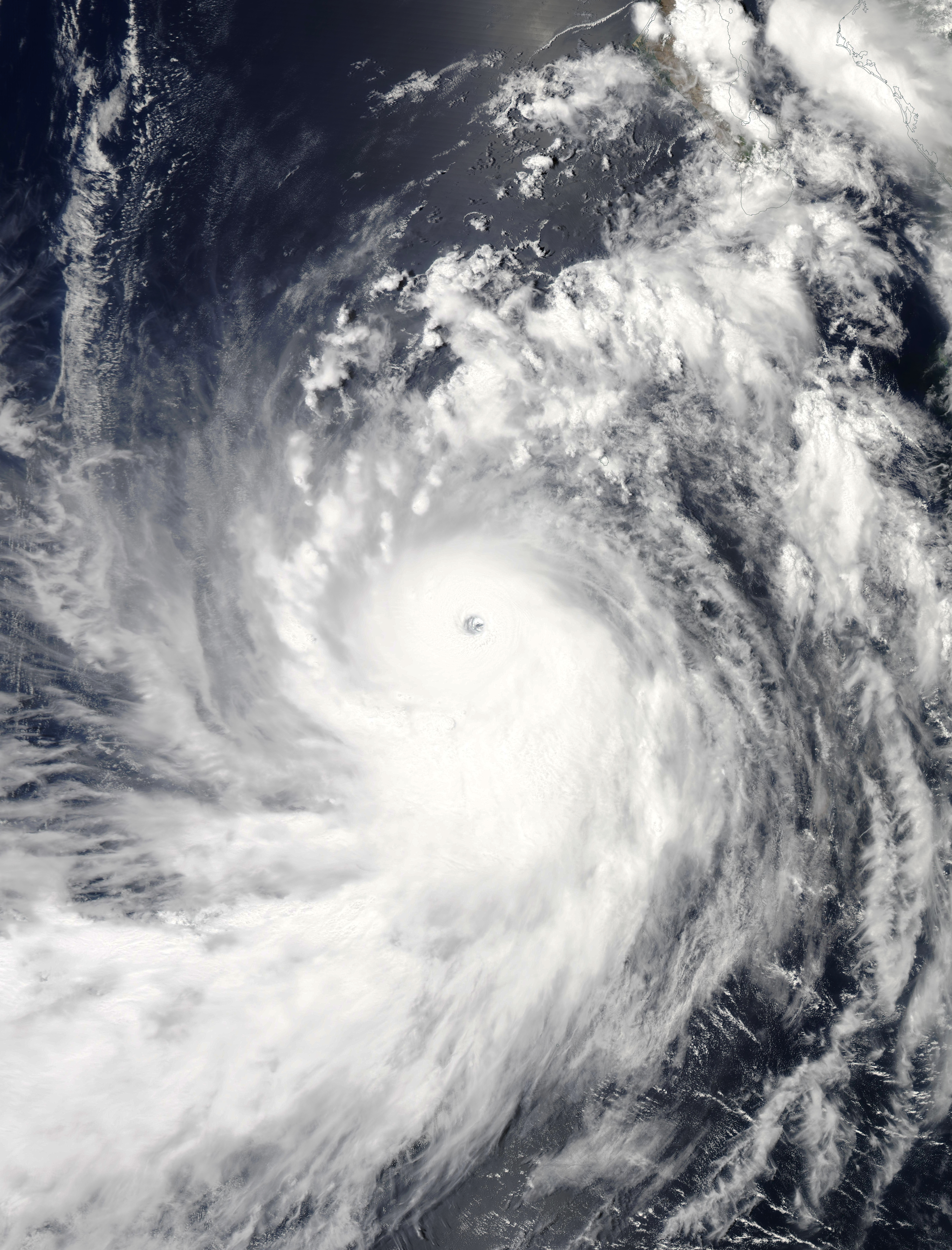
Hurricane Marie

Tropical cyclones formed in August 2014
Storm name	Dates active	Max wind km/h (mph)	Pressure (hPa)	Areas affected	Damage (USD)	Deaths	Refs
Bertha	August 1–6	130 (80)	998	Lesser Antilles, Puerto Rico, Hispaniola, Cuba, Turks and Caicos Islands, The Bahamas, East Coast of the United States, Western Europe	Minimal	4	
Julio	August 4–15	195 (120)	960	Hawaii	None	None	
LAND 02	August 4–7	55 (35)	Not specified	India	Minor	47	
Karina	August 13–26	140 (85)	983	None	None	None	
Lowell	August 17–24	120 (75)	980	None	None	None	
TD	August 19	Not specified	1006	Taiwan, China	None	None	
Marie	August 22–28	260 (160)	918	Mexico, California	$20 million	6	
Cristobal	August 23–29	140 (85)	965	Puerto Rico, Hispaniola, Turks and Caicos Islands, East Coast of the United States, Bermuda, Iceland	Unknown	7	
TD	August 24–26	Not specified	1006	None	None	None	
TD	August 27–29	Not specified	1004	China, Vietnam, Laos	None	None	

=== September ===
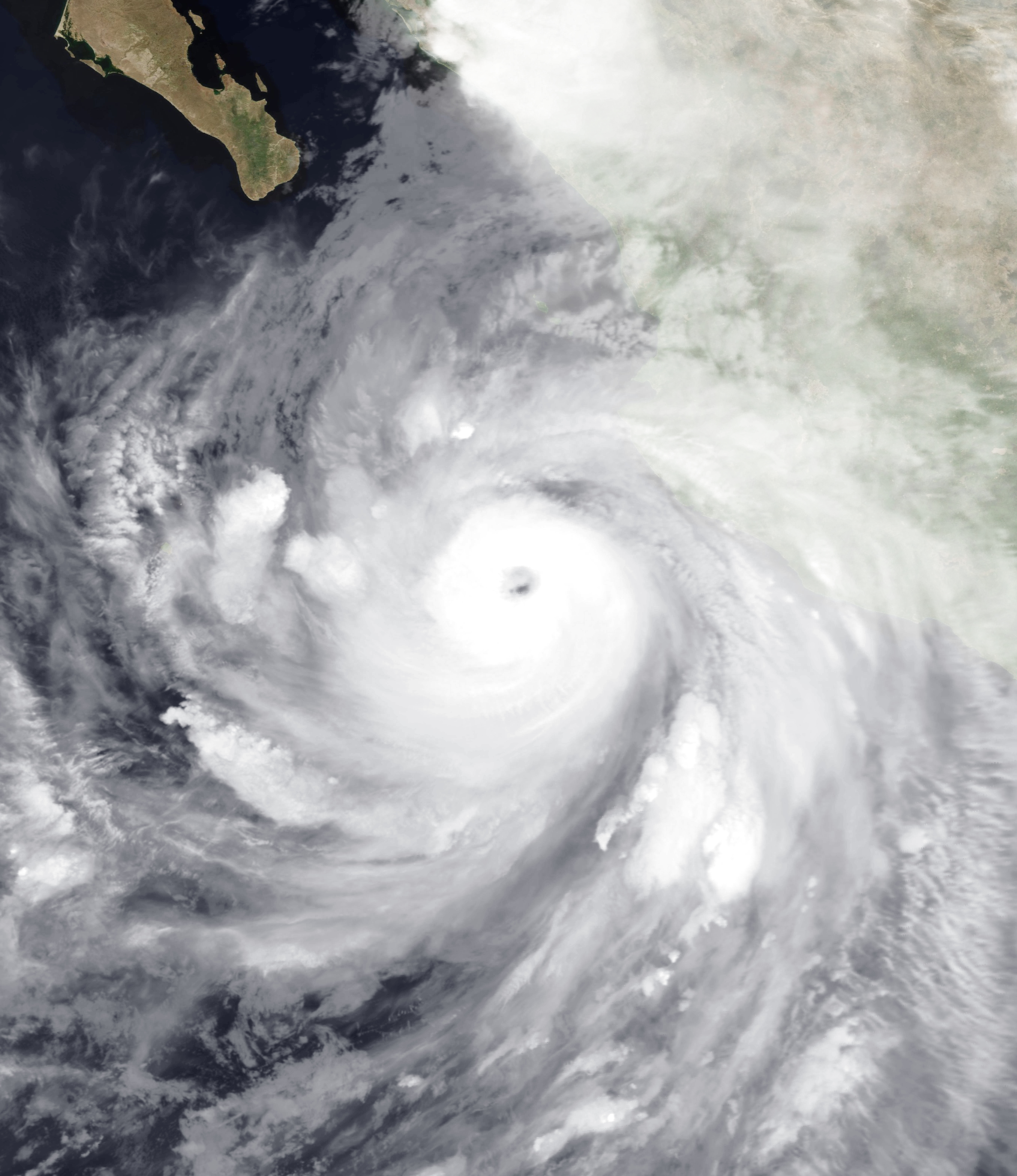
Hurricane Odile

Tropical cyclones formed in September 2014
Storm name	Dates active	Max wind km/h (mph)	Pressure (hPa)	Areas affected	Damage (USD)	Deaths	Refs
Dolly	September 1–3	85 (50)	1000	Mexico (Tamaulipas), Texas	$22.2 million	1	
Norbert	September 2–7	205 (125)	950	Western Mexico, Baja California Peninsula, Southwestern United States	$28.3 million	5	
TD	September 4–5	Not specified	1006	None	None	None	
Fengshen	September 5–10	110 (70)	975	Japan	None	None	
14W (Karding)	September 5–8	55 (35)	1004	Philippines, China, Vietnam	None	None	
Odile	September 10–18	220 (140)	918	Mexico, Baja California Peninsula, Southwestern United States, Texas	$1.25 billion	18	
Edouard	September 11–19	195 (120)	955	East Coast of the United States	Minor	2	
Sixteen-E	September 11–15	55 (35)	1005	Baja California Sur	None	None	
Kalmaegi (Luis)	September 11–17	140 (85)	960	Caroline Islands, Philippines, China, Indochina, India	$2.92 billion	48	
Polo	September 16–22	120 (75)	979	Mexico, Baja California Peninsula	$7.6 million	1	
Fung-wong (Mario)	September 17–24	85 (50)	985	Philippines, Taiwan, Japan, China, South Korea	$231 million	22	
Kammuri	September 23–30	95 (60)	985	Mariana Islands, Japan	None	None	
Rachel	September 24–30	140 (85)	980	None	None	None	
Phanfone (Neneng)	September 28–October 6	175 (110)	935	Mariana Islands, Japan, Alaska	$100 million	11	

=== October ===
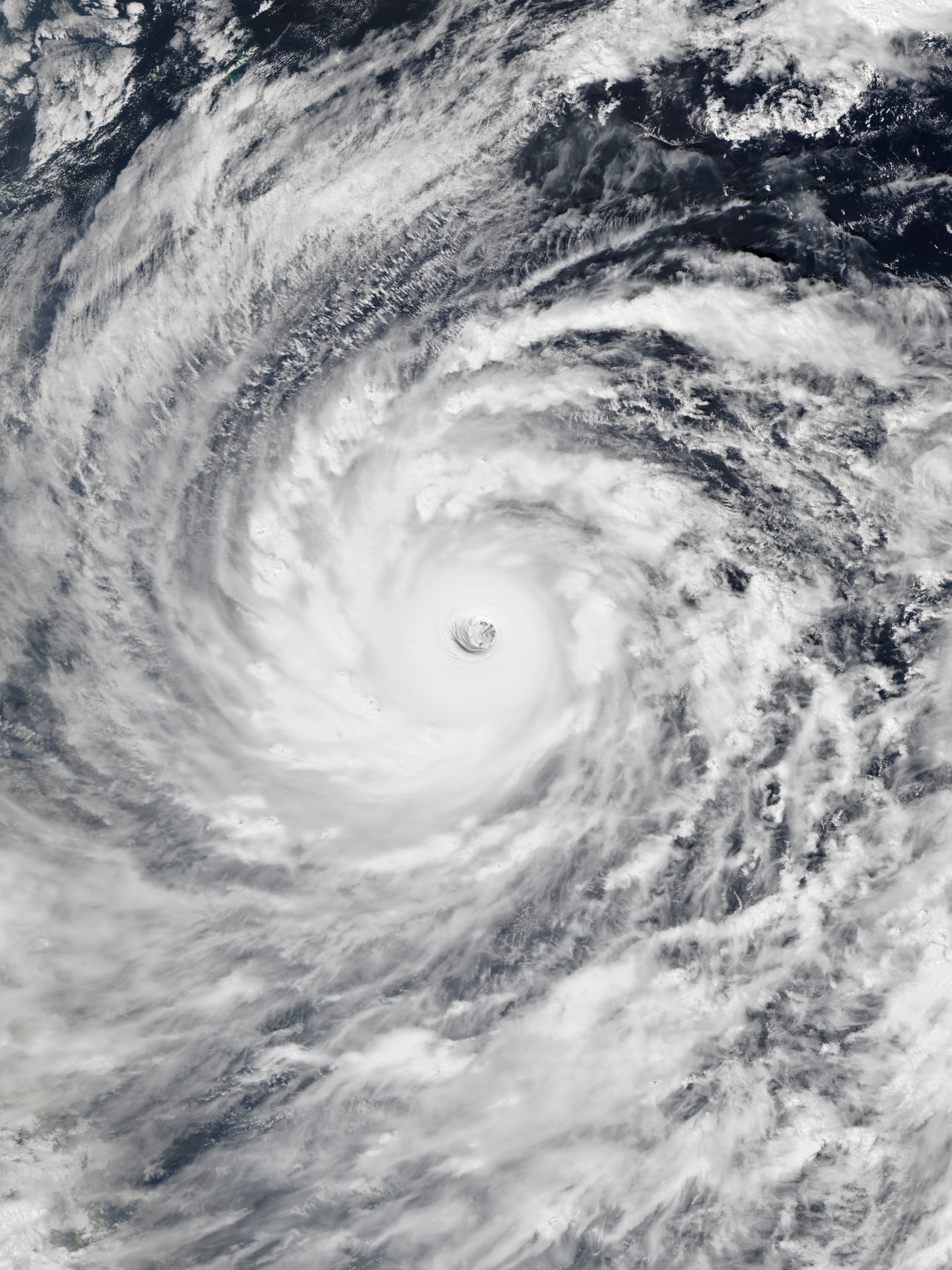
Typhoon Vongfong

Tropical cyclones formed in October 2014
Storm name	Dates active	Max wind km/h (mph)	Pressure (hPa)	Areas affected	Damage (USD)	Deaths	Refs
Simon	October 1–7	215 (130)	946	Mexico, Baja California Peninsula, Southwestern United States	Unknown	None	
Vongfong (Ompong)	October 2–14	215 (130)	900	Caroline Islands, Mariana Islands, Philippines, Taiwan, Japan, South Korea, Kamchatka Peninsula, Alaska	$161 million	9	
Hudhud	October 7–14	185 (115)	950	Andaman and Nicobar Islands, Andhra Pradesh, Vishakhapatnam, Odisha, Chhattisgarh, Madhya Pradesh, Uttar Pradesh, Nepal	$3.58 billion	124	
Fay	October 10–13	130 (80)	983	Bermuda	≥$3.8 million	None	
Gonzalo	October 12–19	230 (145)	940	Leeward Islands, Puerto Rico, Bermuda, Newfoundland, Europe	>$317 million	6	
Ana	October 13–26	140 (85)	985	Hawaii, British Columbia, Alaskan Panhandle	Minimal	None	
Trudy	October 17–19	100 (65)	998	Mexico	>$12.3 million	9	
Hanna	October 22–28	65 (40)	1000	Mexico, Central America	Unknown	None	
Nilofar	October 25–31	205 (125)	950	Oman, India, Pakistan	Minimal	4	
Vance	October 30–November 5	175 (110)	964	Mexico	Minimal	None	
Nuri (Paeng)	October 30–November 5	205 (125)	910	Japan	Minimal	None	

=== November ===
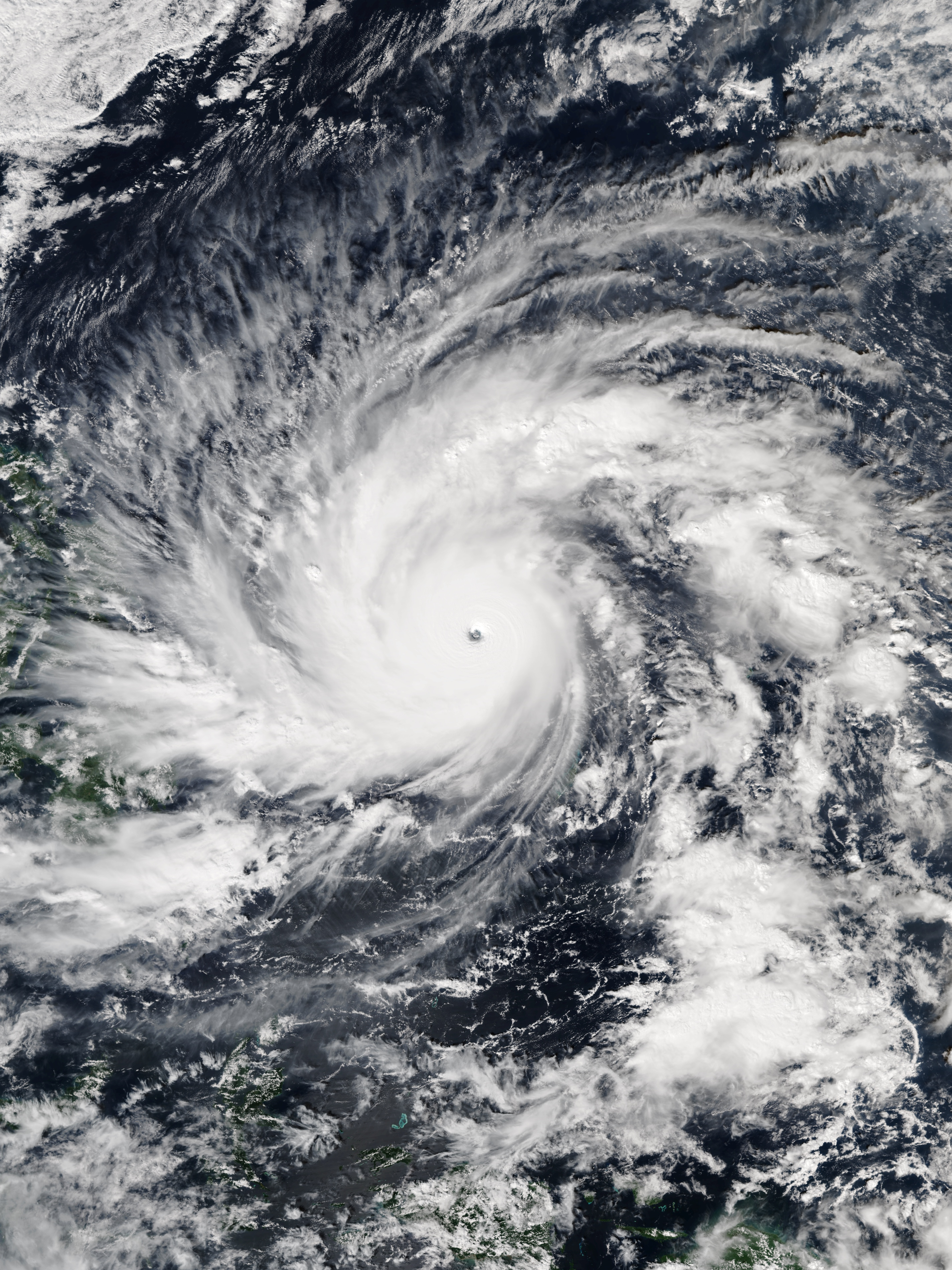
Typhoon Hagupit

A total of 7 storms formed within the month of November, of which 4 were named. Typhoon Hagupit was the strongest storm of the month and the second-most intense storm of the year, impacting the Philippines a few weeks after Sinlaku affected the Philippines as a tropical depression. Cyclone Qendresa was a rare system that caused damages and 3 deaths in Italy.

Tropical cyclones formed in November 2014
Storm name	Dates active	Max wind km/h (mph)	Pressure (hPa)	Areas affected	Damage (USD)	Deaths	Refs
BOB 04	November 5–8	55 (35)	1000	None	None	None	
Qendresa	November 5–11	110 (70)	978	Libya, Tunisia, Italy, Malta, Greece	$250 million	3	
Adjali	November 15–21	110 (70)	987	None	None	None	
01F	November 21–26	Not specified	1003	Tokelau, Tuvalu, Wallis and Futuna, Samoan Islands	Minimal	None	
02	November 24–30	55 (35)	997	Diego Garcia, Mauritius, Rodrigues	None	None	
Sinlaku (Queenie)	November 26–30	85 (50)	990	Palau, Philippines, Vietnam, Laos, Cambodia	$4.26 million	4	
Hagupit (Ruby)	November 30–December 12	215 (130)	905	Caroline Islands, Palau, Philippines, Vietnam	$114 million	18	

=== December ===
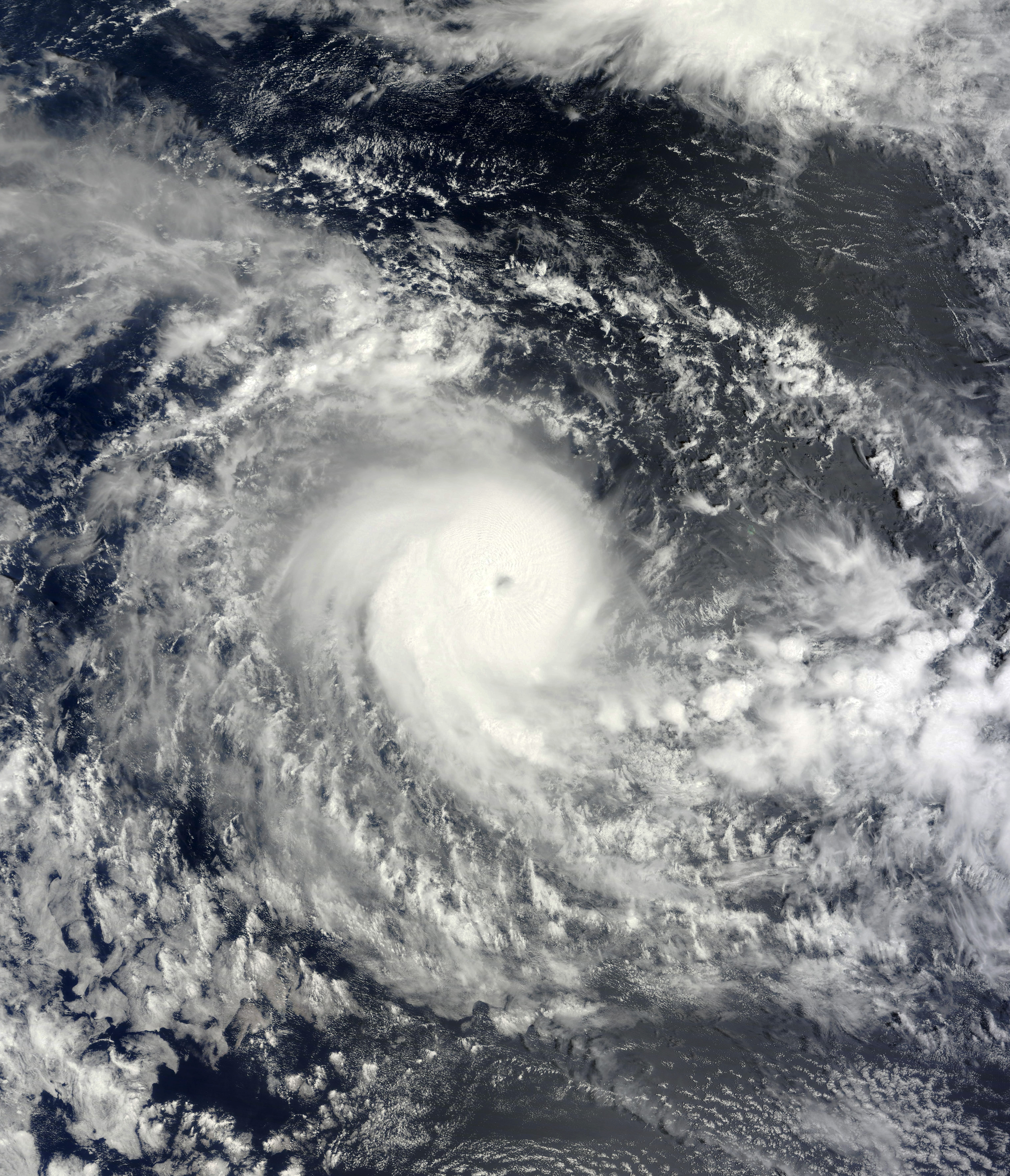
Cyclone Kate

Tropical cyclones formed in December 2014
Storm name	Dates active	Max wind km/h (mph)	Pressure (hPa)	Areas affected	Damage (USD)	Deaths	Refs
01U	December 3–4	55 (35)	1000	None	None	None	
Bakung	December 10–13	95 (60)	991	Indonesia	None	None	
03U	December 13–15	Not specified	Not specified	None	None	None	
02F	December 16–17	Not specified	1007	None	None	None	
03F	December 20–26	55 (35)	998	Cook Islands	None	None	
04F	December 21–24	Not specified	1000	French Polynesia	None	None	
Kate	December 21–31	165 (105)	950	Cocos Islands	Minimal	None	
05F	December 23–29	Not specified	1000	Samoan Islands	None	None	
Jangmi (Seniang)	December 28–January 1	75 (45)	996	Philippines, Borneo	$28.4 million	66	

== Global effects ==
There are a total of seven tropical cyclone basins that tropical cyclones typically form in this table, data from all these basins are added.

Season name		Areas affected	Systems formed	Named storms	Hurricane-force tropical cyclones	Damage (2014 USD)	Deaths	Ref.
North Atlantic Ocean (Note: The wind speeds for this tropical cyclone/basin are based on the Saffir Simpson Scale which uses 1-minute sustained winds.)		East Coast of the United States, Yucatán Peninsula, Lesser Antilles, Greater Antilles, Western Europe, Atlantic Canada, Central America, Lucayan Archipelago, West Africa, Cape Verde, Azores	9	8	6	$382.5 million	17 (4)	
Eastern and Central Pacific Ocean		Southwestern Mexico, Western Mexico, Central America, Hawaii, Baja California Peninsula, Northwestern Mexico, Southwestern United States, British Columbia, Alaskan Panhandle, Western Canada	23	22	16	≥$2.09 billion	49 (1)	
Western Pacific Ocean (Note: Only systems that formed either before or on December 31, 2013 are counted in the seasonal totals.)		Micronesia, Taiwan, Philippines, China, Vietnam, Mariana Islands, Japan, Korean Peninsula, Laos, Russian Far East, Thailand, Myanmar, Alaska	31	22	13	$12.89 billion	576	
North Indian Ocean (Note: The wind speeds for this tropical cyclone/basin are based on the IMD Scale which uses 3-minute sustained winds.)		Sri Lanka, Andaman and Nicobar Islands, India, Pakistan, Oman, Bangladesh, Visakhapatnam, Nepal	8	3	2	$11 billion	179	
South-West Indian Ocean	January – June (Note: Only systems that formed either on or after January 1, 2014 are counted in the seasonal totals.) (Note: The wind speeds for this tropical cyclone are based on Météo-France, which uses wind gusts.)	Mozambique, Madagascar, Mauritius, Réunion, Comoro Islands	10	7	3	$32.5 million	10	
South-West Indian Ocean	July – December	Diego Garcia, Mauritius, Rodrigues	2	1	1	—N/a	—N/a	
Australian region	January – June	Australia, Solomon Islands, New Caledonia, Vanuatu, East Timor, Indonesia, Christmas Island, New Zealand, Cocos (Keeling) Islands	12	7	3	$1.15 billion	40	
Australian region	July – December	Indonesia	4	2	1	—N/a	—N/a	
South Pacific Ocean	January – June	Fiji, Tonga, Solomon Islands, New Caledonia, New Zealand, Cook Islands, Niue, Vanuatu,	12	5	2	$123 million	12	
South Pacific Ocean	July – December	Tokelau, Tuvalu, Wallis and Futuna, Samoan Islands, Cook Islands, French Polynesia	5	—N/a	—N/a	—N/a	—N/a	
Mediterranean Sea		Western Europe	1	1	1	$250 million	3	
Worldwide			117 (Note: The sum of the number of systems in each basin will not equal the number shown as the total. This is because when systems move between basins, it creates a discrepancy in the actual number of systems.)	78	48	$28 billion	886 (5)	

== Notes ==
^{1} Only systems that formed either on or after January 1, 2014 are counted in the seasonal totals.
^{2} Only systems that formed either before or on December 31, 2014 are counted in the seasonal totals.
^{3} The wind speeds for this tropical cyclone/basin are based on the IMD Scale which uses 3-minute sustained winds.
^{4} The wind speeds for this tropical cyclone/basin are based on the Saffir Simpson Scale which uses 1-minute sustained winds.
^{5}The wind speeds for this tropical cyclone are based on Météo-France which uses gust winds.

== See also ==
- Tropical cyclones by year
- List of earthquakes in 2014
- Tornadoes of 2014
