= Typhoon Halong (2014) =

Pacific typhoon in 2014

Typhoon Halong (Jose)
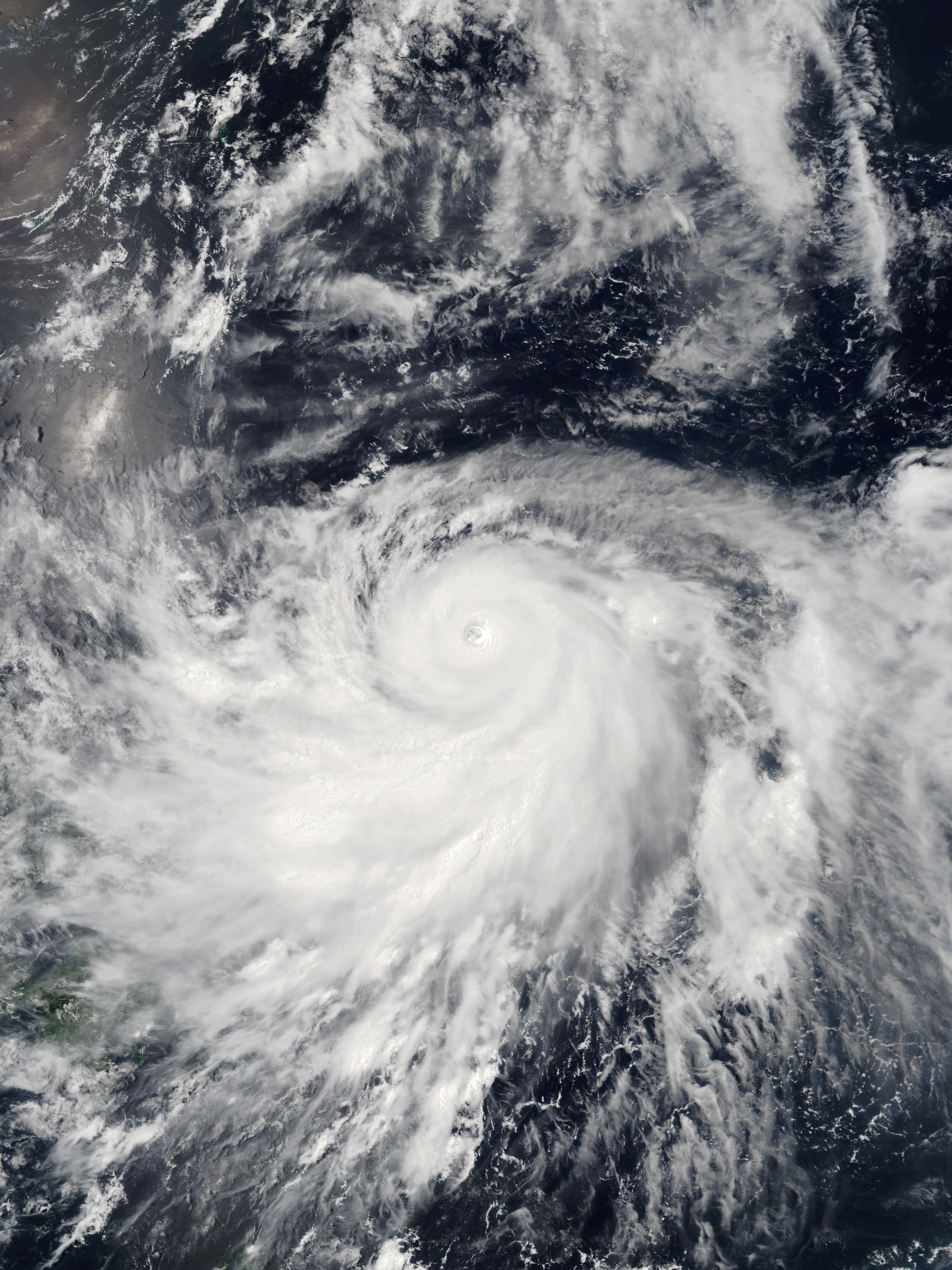
- Typhoon Halong at peak intensity east of the Philippines on August 3

Meteorological history
- Formed: July 27, 2014
- Extratropical: August 11, 2014
- Dissipated: August 15, 2014

Violent typhoon
- 10-minute sustained (JMA)
- Highest winds: 195 km/h (120 mph)
- Lowest pressure: 920 hPa (mbar); 27.17 inHg

Category 5-equivalent super typhoon
- 1-minute sustained (SSHWS)
- Highest winds: 260 km/h (160 mph)
- Lowest pressure: 918 hPa (mbar); 27.11 inHg

Overall effects
- Fatalities: 12 total
- Damage: $72.8 million (2014 USD)
- Areas affected: Caroline Islands, Mariana Islands, Philippines, Japan, Russia
- IBTrACS
- Part of the 2014 Pacific typhoon season

Typhoon Halong, (Note: The name Halong (Vietnamese: Hạ Long, [haː˧˨ʔ lawŋ͡m˧˧]) was contributed by Vietnam and refers to Hạ Long Bay in Vietnamese.) known in the Philippines as Typhoon Jose, was an intense Typhoon in the Western Pacific basin in early August 2014. It was the twelfth named storm and the fifth typhoon of the 2014 Pacific typhoon season. The storm reached its maximum intensity as a Category 5 super typhoon, making it the fifth strongest storm of the season, surpassed by Genevieve, Vongfong, Nuri, and Hagupit.

== Meteorological history ==
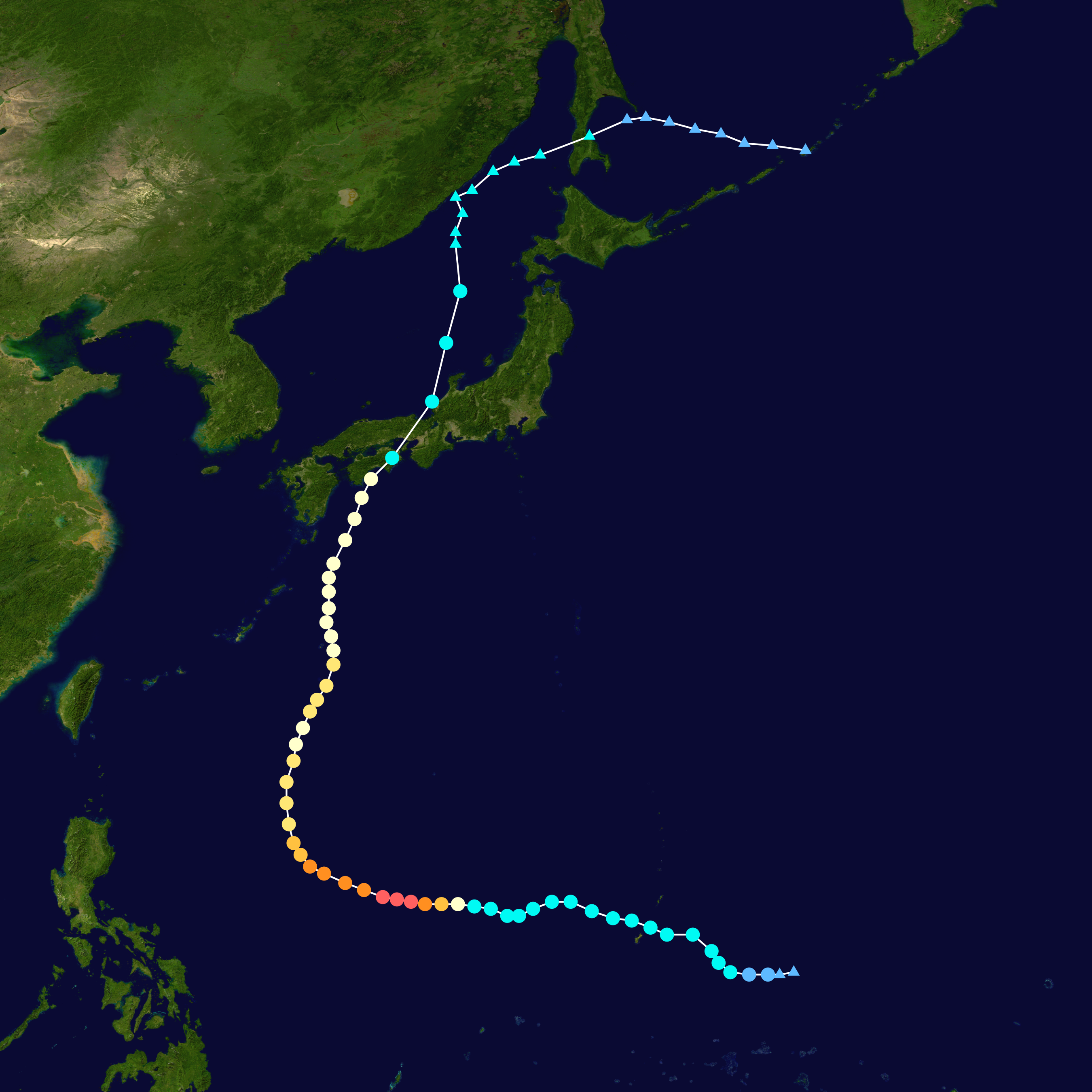
Map plotting the storm's track and intensity, according to the Saffir–Simpson scale Map key Saffir–Simpson scale Tropical depression (≤38 mph, ≤62 km/h) Tropical storm (39–73 mph, 63–118 km/h) Category 1 (74–95 mph, 119–153 km/h) Category 2 (96–110 mph, 154–177 km/h) Category 3 (111–129 mph, 178–208 km/h) Category 4 (130–156 mph, 209–251 km/h) Category 5 (≥157 mph, ≥252 km/h) Unknown Storm type Tropical cyclone Subtropical cyclone Extratropical cyclone, remnant low, tropical disturbance, or monsoon depression

On July 26, JMA monitored a low-pressure area near Chuuk. The system stalled for a few days and was upgraded into a tropical depression on July 27. Early on July 29, the depression showed signs of intensification, and with that, JTWC upgraded it to Tropical Storm 11W. Later that day, JMA upgraded 11W to Tropical Storm Halong. At the same time, Halong started developing a small, indistinct eye. With this, gale- and typhoon-force winds were reported over Guam.

Very late on July 30, JMA upgraded Halong to a severe tropical storm. The next day, both agencies upgraded it to a minimal typhoon. At the same time, Halong started its rapid deepening phase. On August 2, Halong's eye developed clearer than before as the system underwent explosive intensification from a Category 1 typhoon to a Category 3 in less than 24 hours. Rapid deepening continued, and it eventually became a Category 5 super typhoon, with pressure dropping from 980 to 925 mbar in 48 hours. However, late that day, JMA revised Typhoon Halong's minimum pressure to 920 mbar. On August 4, Halong weakened to a Category 4 typhoon due to it undergoing an eyewall replacement cycle. The next day, Halong weakened to a minimal typhoon, although it was a deep typhoon due to its pressure. On the same day, its convection was steadily weakening.

On August 6, NASA reported that Halong was beginning to undergo an eyewall replacement cycle. This made the JTWC upgrade it to a Category 2 typhoon again. Its eye continued to undergo the eyewall replacement cycle until August 8. On the same day, Halong weakened to a Category 1 typhoon and started to affect mainland Japan. The JTWC downgraded Halong to a tropical storm on August 9, while the JMA followed suit several hours later. Halong made landfall over southern Japan, specifically over Shikoku, on August 10. On August 10, JTWC issued its final bulletin on Halong, as it was leaving the country. The JMA also issued their final advisory on August 11, as it was becoming extratropical. Its remnants dissipated early on August 15 over Siberia, as it was absorbed by a developing extratropical system.

== Preparations and impact ==
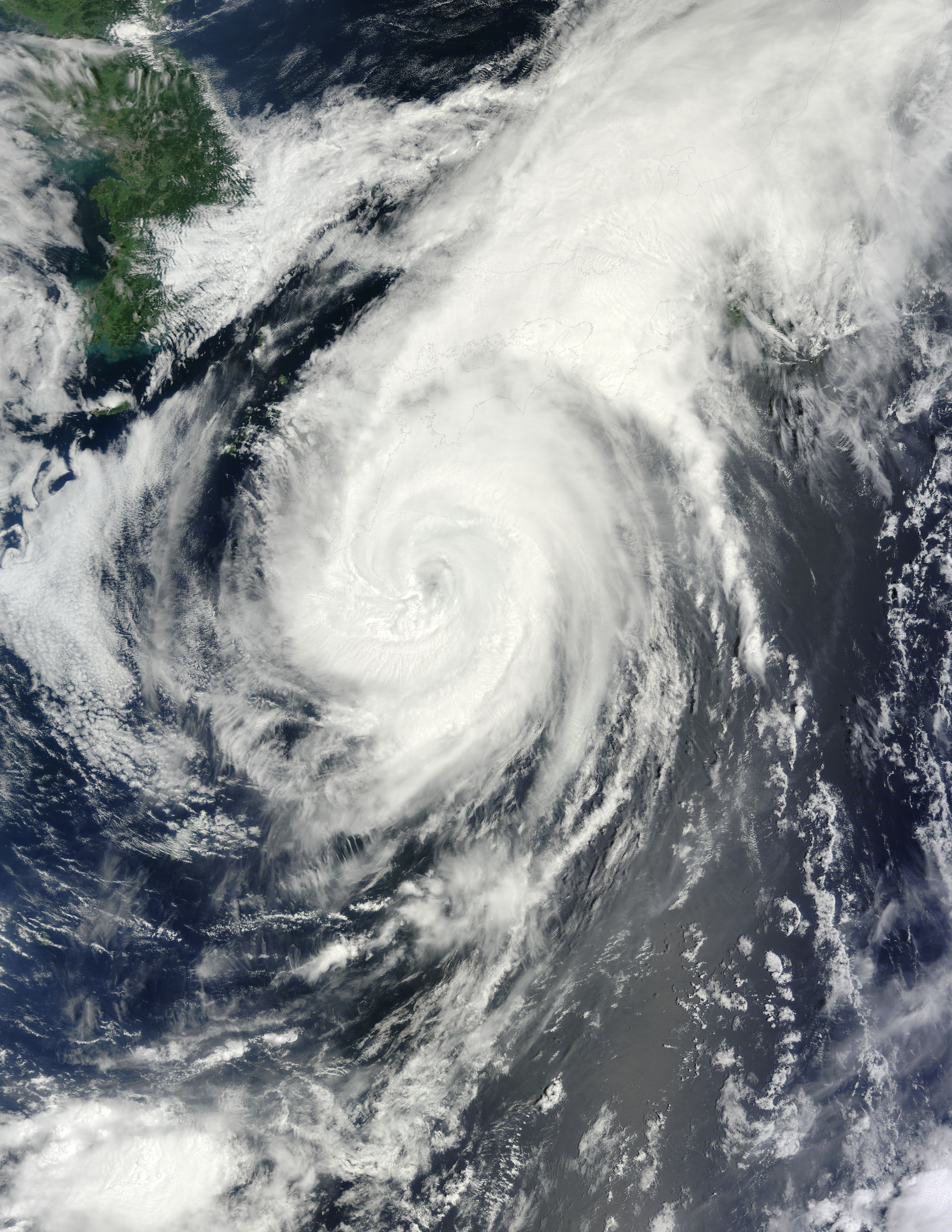
Typhoon Halong approaching Shikoku, Japan on August 9

=== Philippines ===
In Subic, Zambales, 4 rescue boats were ready in case of flash floods. The Subic Public Order and Safety Office had also prepared rescue equipment for possible flooding.

Typhoon Halong was known in the Philippines as Typhoon Jose. On August 4, the NDRRMC warned residents of flood- and landslide-prone areas in Luzon to take precautions as Typhoon Halong would enhance the southwest monsoon. PAGASA also issued a gale warning in Luzon.

On August 7, 2 people were reported missing in Pangasinan due to the enhanced monsoonal rains from Jose. They were reported dead the next day. A total of nearly 16,000 people were affected by the enhanced monsoon. NDRRMC said that a total of ₱1.62 million (US$37,000) was from agricultural damages from the same province alone.

Although it did not make landfall in the Philippines, the name Jose was retired from its naming lists as it caused about P1.6 billion (US$36.3 million) in damage. PAGASA retired the name Josie in favor of Jennie following damage in 2018, updating the previous replacement of Jose.

=== Japan ===
The eye of Halong was located east of the Daitō Islands on August 7, bringing typhoon-force winds over the islands. Later that day, the storm passed within 40 km (25 mi) over an island. Early on August 9, Halong underwent a deep eyewall replacement cycle, just before landfall over mainland Japan. Later that day, it was reported that a 78-year-old man died in Iwate Prefecture due to heavy flooding. In the early morning of August 10, Halong made landfall over Shikoku as a minimal typhoon, just before being downgraded as a severe tropical storm by the JMA. About 1.6 million people in Japan had to evacuate during the storm. In total, the storm is responsible for 10 deaths and 96 injuries. Agricultural damage in Okinawa, Kochi, and Wakayama was calculated at around ¥3.72 billion (US$36.5 million).

== See also ==
- Weather of 2014
- Tropical cyclones in 2014
- Typhoon Maemi (2003)
- Typhoon Tokage (2004)
- Typhoon Roke (2011)
- Typhoon Wipha (2013)
- Typhoon Neoguri (2014)
- Typhoon Nangka (2015)
- Typhoon Saola (2023) and Typhoon Krathon (2024) – the other two storms that were retired by the PAGASA despite it not directly making landfall in the Philippines.
